= Anticonvulsant hypersensitivity syndrome =

Anticonvulsant/sulfonamide hypersensitivity syndrome is a potentially serious hypersensitivity reaction that can be seen with medications with an aromatic amine chemical structure, such as aromatic anticonvulsants (e.g. diphenylhydantoin, phenobarbital, phenytoin, carbamazepine, lamotrigine), sulfonamides, or other medications with an aromatic amine (e.g., procainamide). Cross-reactivity should not occur between medications with an aromatic amine and medications without an aromatic amine (e.g., sulfonylureas, thiazide diuretics, furosemide, and acetazolamide); therefore, these medications can be safely used in the future.

The hypersensitivity syndrome is characterized by a rash that is initially rash that appears similar to measles (morbilliform). The rash may also be one of the potentially lethal severe cutaneous adverse reactions, the DRESS syndrome, Stevens–Johnson syndrome, or toxic epidermal necrolysis. Systemic manifestations occur at the time of skin manifestations and include a high number of eosinophils in the blood, liver inflammation, and interstitial nephritis. However, a subgroup of patients may become hypothyroid as part of an autoimmune thyroiditis up to 2 months after the initiation of symptoms.

This kind of adverse drug reaction is caused by the accumulation of toxic metabolites; it is not the result of an IgE-mediated reaction. The risk of first-degree relatives developing the same hypersensitivity reaction is higher than in the general population.

As this syndrome can present secondary to multiple anticonvulsants, the general term "anticonvulsant hypersensitivity syndrome" (AHS) is favored over the original descriptive term "dilantin hypersensitivity syndrome." As of 2015, two cases of AHS have been reported that manifested during long-term treatment with multiple anti-seizure medications. Death due to multiple organ failure can occur; symptoms also mimic lymphoma, and AHS has been called "pseudolymphoma" as a result. Changing the medications involved to those in a different class can avoid further problems.

== See also ==
- Severe cutaneous adverse reactions (i.e. SCARs)
- Skin lesion
- List of cutaneous conditions
