= Allopurinol hypersensitivity syndrome =

- Other names: AHS
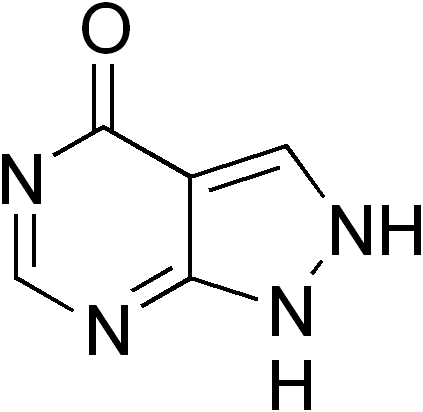
- Allopurinol
- Symptoms: Fever, Cutaneous Reaction, Eosinophilia, Acute Renal Failure.
- Treatment: Systematic Corticosteroids.
- Frequency: Rare

Allopurinol hypersensitivity syndrome (AHS) typically occurs in persons with preexisting kidney failure. Weeks to months after allopurinol is begun, the patient develops a morbilliform eruption or, less commonly, develops one of the far more serious and potentially lethal severe cutaneous adverse reactions viz., the DRESS syndrome, Stevens Johnson syndrome, or toxic epidermal necrolysis. About 1 in 1000 patients receiving allopurinol are affected, and mortality rates have been reported to be between 20% and 25%.

== Signs and symptoms ==
Allopurinol has been linked to severe cutaneous adverse reactions (SCAR), toxic epidermal necrolysis, Stevens-Johnson syndrome, and drug reaction with eosinophilia and systemic symptoms (DRESS). Clinically, these syndromes are similar in that they both involve fever, eosinophilia, rash, and dysfunction of the liver and kidneys.

== Causes ==
=== Risk factors ===
In a retrospective case-control study, it was shown that an increased initial dose of allopurinol was linked to AHS.

Oxypurinol is quickly transformed from allopurinol and then eliminated by the kidneys. The mean half-life of oxypurinol in patients with normal kidney function is 23 hours, although 95% of patients have half-lives between 9 and 38 hours. The half-life of oxypurinol increases with decreasing kidney function, allowing it to build up over an extended period of time and reach higher steady-state concentrations; among those suffering from anuria, nearly no oxypurinol is eliminated. The first report of the link between kidney impairment and AHS was found in a 1984 case series, wherein 58 patients with AHS had demonstrated signs of kidney impairment before starting allopurinol treatment. Additionally, among the most common co-morbidities in a comprehensive analysis of all 901 reported cases of AHS, chronic kidney disease was present in 182 out of 376 (48%) patients.

=== Triggers ===
After beginning allopurinol, allopurinol hypersensitivity syndrome usually manifests itself in the first few weeks to months. Ninety percent of the 901 documented cases of AHS in the largest review to date began within the first 8 to 9 weeks of starting allopurinol, with a median time to onset of 3 weeks.

=== Genetics ===
The HLA-B gene belongs to the family of genes called the HLA complex. An odds ratio of 80–580 has been reported to link the HLA-B*58:01 allele to a higher risk of allopurinol-induced DRESS and SJS/TEN.

== Prevention ==
Preventative measures include using alternative drugs, genetic screening, and modifying the starting dose.

== Treatment ==
Treatment consists of discontinuing allopurinol and providing supportive care. Immunomodulatory treatments and systemic steroids might be helpful. Whether a patient has toxic epidermal necrolysis, Stevens-Johnson syndrome, or drug reaction with eosinophilia and systemic symptoms will determine the course of treatment. Allopurinol should not be given to patients who develop AHS again; instead, alternative urate-lowering medications, such as febuxostat, may be taken into consideration.

== See also ==
- Severe cutaneous adverse reactions
- List of cutaneous conditions
