= Severe cutaneous adverse reactions =

Group of adverse drug reactions involving the skin and mucosa

- Other names: SCARs
- Specialty: Dermatology

Severe cutaneous adverse reactions (SCARs) are a group of potentially lethal adverse drug reactions that involve the skin and mucous membranes of various body openings such as the eyes, ears, and inside the nose, mouth, and lips. In more severe cases, SCARs also involves serious damage to internal organs.

SCARs includes five syndromes:

1. Drug reaction with eosinophilia and systemic symptoms (i.e. DRESS syndrome), also termed drug-induced hypersensitivity syndrome (DIHS);
2. Stevens–Johnson syndrome (SJS);
3. Toxic epidermal necrolysis (TEN);
4. Stevens-Johnson/toxic epidermal necrolysis overlap syndrome (SJS/TEN); and
5. Acute generalized exanthematous pustulosis (AGEP).

The five disorders have similar pathophysiologies, i.e. disease-causing mechanisms, for which new strategies are in use or development to identify individuals predisposed to develop the SCARs-inducing effects of specific drugs and thereby avoid treatment with them. Maculopapular rash (MPR) is a less-well defined and benign form of drug-induced adverse skin reactions; while not classified in the SCARs group, it shares a similar pathophysiology with SCARs and is caused by some of the same drugs which cause SCARs.

Adverse drug reactions are major therapeutic problems estimated to afflict up to 20% of inpatients and 25% of outpatients. About 90% of these adverse reactions take the form of benign morbilliform rash hypersensitivity drug reactions such as MPR. However, they also include more serious reactions:

1. Pseudo-allergic reactions in which a drug directly stimulates mast cells, basophils, and/or eosinophils to release pro-allergic mediators (e.g. histamine);
2. Type I, Type II, and Type III hypersensitivity reactions of the adaptive immune system mediated by IgE, IgG, and/or IgM antibodies; and
3. SCARs and MPR which are Type IV hypersensitivity reactions of the innate immune system initiated by lymphocytes of the T cell type and mediated by various types of leukocytes and cytokines.

Type IV hypersensitivity reactions are off-target drug reactions, i.e. reactions in which a drug causes toxicity by impacting a biological target other than the one(s) for which it is intended. They are T cell-initiated delayed hypersensitivity reactions occurring selectively in individuals who may be predisposed to do so because of the genetically-based types of human leukocyte antigens (i.e. HLA) or T-cell receptors they express; the efficiency with which they absorb, distribute to tissues, metabolize, and eliminate a drug or drug metabolite; or less well-defined idiosyncrasies.

Categorizing SCARs as a group focuses on the similarities and differences in their pathophysiologies, clinical presentations, instigating drugs, and recommendations for drug avoidance.

== Types ==
=== SJS, TEN, and SJS/TEN ===
Stevens–Johnson syndrome, toxic epidermal necrolysis, and Stevens–Johnson syndrome/Toxic epidermal necrolysis overlap syndrome are a spectrum of Type IV, Subtype IVc, delayed hypersensitivity reactions, i.e. reactions initiated by CD8^{+} T cells and natural killer T cells. They are characterized initially by fever and flu-like symptoms followed within days by skin as well as mucous membrane blisters and denudation. Differentiation of the three disorders is based on the extent of disease with SJS involving <10%, SGS/TEN involving 10% to 30%, and TEN involving >30% of the total bodily skin area. This spectrum of disorders is complicated by inflammation in and damage to internal organs such as the liver and, less commonly, kidney and heart. More importantly, they are also complicated by sepsis due to the loss of skin and mucous membrane epithelial barriers. In one study, SJS, TEN, and SJS/TEN mortality rates were 4.8%, 19.4%, and 14.8%, respectively, with an important portion of the deaths due to bacterial sepsis, particularly in the acute, early stage of these disorders. The drugs most commonly triggering the SJS, TEN, and SJS/TEN spectrum of disorders are anti-infective sulfonamides, anticonvulsants (e.g. carbamazepine and lamotrigine), non-steroidal anti-inflammatory drugs, allopurinol, nevirapine, and chlormezanone. Allopurinol appears in some studies to be the most common instigator of these disorders. Any new biological or herbal remedy, it is suggested, should be considered a possible cause of these disorders under the proper clinical circumstances.

=== DRESS syndrome ===
The DRESS syndrome is a Type IV, Subtype IVb, hypersensitivity drug reaction, i.e. a reaction dependent on CD4(+) cells and the cell- and tissue-injuring action of eosinophils. Skin lesions inflict 73% to 100% of afflicted individuals; they are generally infiltrative macules and plaques. About 75% of cases exhibit facial edema. The syndrome is also associated with other maladies caused by high levels of blood eosinophils such as the various hypereosinophilia-related disorders: persistent asthma and allergic rhinitis and, more significantly, eosinophil-based and lymphocyte-based inflammation of the liver (>70% of cases), kidney (20% to 40% of cases), lung (~33% of cases), heart (4% to 27% of cases), and, uncommonly, the meninges, brain, gastrointestinal tract, and spleen. The disorder is lengthened and worsened in individuals that develop reactivation of latent viruses of the herpes viruses. The estimated mortality rate for the DRESS syndrome is about 10%. Allopurinol and sulfasalazine account for almost 66% of DRESS syndrome cases with minocycline being the third most common cause of the disorder; Strontium ranelate, leflunomide, dapsone, and nonsteroidal anti-inflammatory drugs (diclofenac, celecoxib, ibuprofen, and phenylbutazone) are less common causes of the disorder.

=== AGEP ===
AGEP is a rare Type IV, subtype IVd, hypersensitivity reaction dependent on neutrophils and characterized by the rapid formation of skin pustules on an erythematous background. In one study of 28 patients, the disorder was complicated by involvement of the kidney (36% of cases), lung (27%), and liver (11%). It is the least severe of the SCARs disorders, typically shows a mild course, and is rarely associated with severe complications although superinfection of skin lesions may be life-threatening.

== Pathophysiology ==
Individuals are predisposed to develop SCARs in response to a given drug based on the types of human leukocyte antigen (i.e. HLA) proteins and T-cell receptors that they express; their ability to process an instigating drug or the drug's metabolite(s); and other less well-defined factors. These predispositions are a consequence of the HLA allele and T-cell receptor variants that individuals express in their antigen presentation immune pathways; their ADME, i.e. efficiency in Absorbing, Distributing to tissues, Metabolizing, and/or Eliminating a drug or drug metabolite; and other less well-defined factors.

=== HLA proteins ===
Drugs can cause SCARs by subverting the antigen presentation pathways which recognize and trigger immune responses to non-self epitopes (i.e. antigens) on foreign proteins. These proteins are taken up by antigen-presenting cells (APC) and degraded into small peptides. The peptides are inserted into a groove on HLA proteins that are part of major histocompatibility complexes (i.e. MHC) and presented to T-cell receptors (TCR) on nearby cytotoxic T cells (i.e. CD8^{+} T cells) or T helper cells (i.e. CD4^{+} T cells). T-cell receptors are heterologous; only a small fraction of them can bind a particular epitope on presented peptides and this binding is restricted to non-self epitopes. Upon binding a non-self epitope on a presented peptide, a T-cell receptor becomes active in stimulating its parent cell to mount one of two types of immune responses based on whether the APC presenting the peptide is professional or non-professional in type. Non-professional APC include all nucleated cells; these cells load the processed peptides onto MHC class I (i.e. HLA-A, HLA-B, or HLA-C) proteins and thereon present the peptides to CD8^{+} T cells. Those CD8^{+} T cells whose T-cell receptors bind a non-self epitope on the peptides are stimulated to attack cells or pathogens expressing this epitope. Professional APC are dendritic cells, macrophages, and B cells. They load processed peptides onto MHC class II (i.e. HLA-DM, HLA-DO, HLA-DP, HLA-DQ, or HLA-DR) proteins and thereon present the peptides to CD4^{+} T cells. Those CD4^{+} T cells whose T-cell receptors bind a non-self epitope on presented peptides are stimulated to orchestrate various immune reactions that attack soluble proteins, pathogens, and host cells and tissues that express the non-self epitope. SCARs-inducing drugs can act through these pathways to cause CD8^{+} or CD4^{+} T cells to mount immune responses that are inappropriately directed against bodily tissues. Four models propose the underlying mechanisms by which SCARs-inducing drugs may activate T cells to mount immune responses against self:

- Hapten model: A drug (here termed a hapten) covalently binds to a host protein to create a non-self epitope; the protein is degraded in APC to drug-bound peptides which are loaded onto the groove in HLA proteins and then presented to T cells. Those T cells whose T-cell receptors bind the drug-related epitope on a presented peptide are thereby activated.
- Pro-hapten model: This model is identical to the hapten model except that a drug's metabolite rather than the drug acts as the hapten that forms the non-self epitope.
- P-i model: A drug or its metabolite fits into the groove in HLA proteins to become a non-self epitope which is presented to and activates T cells whose T-cell receptors bind the drug-related epitope; alternatively, the drug binds to T-cell receptors on and thereby directly activates the receptors' parent T cells.
- Altered peptide repertoire model: A drug or its metabolite binds directly to a HLA protein outside of its groove to alter the HLA protein's structure; the altered HLA protein thereby contains a non-self epitope which activates those T cells whose T-cell receptors bind the drug-created epitope.

HLA genes are highly polymorphic, i.e. have many different serotypes (i.e. alleles) while T-cell receptor genes receptors are edited. i.e. altered to encode proteins with different amino acid sequences. Humans, it is estimated, express more than 10,000 different HLA class I proteins, 3,000 different HLA class II proteins, and 100 trillion different T-cell receptors. An individual, however, expresses only a fraction of these polymorphic or edited gene products. Since a SCARs-inducing drug interacts with only one or a few types of HLA proteins or T-cell receptors, its ability to induce a SCARs disorder is limited to those individuals who express those HLA proteins that make the appropriate HLA/non-self peptide or the T cell that expresses the T-cell receptor that recognize the non-self epitope created by the drug. Thus, only rare individuals are predisposed to develop a SCARs disorder in response to a particular drug on the bases of their expression of specific HLA protein or T-cell receptor types.

SCARs disorders are triggered by wide range of drugs with the most commonly reported offenders being Carbamazepine, allopurinol, abacavir, phenytoin, and nevirapine. These drugs evoke SCARs by interacting with one or just a few HLA proteins. The following table list drugs repeatedly implicated in eliciting SCARs; it also gives the drugs' therapeutic targets, HLA serotypes through which they act, the types of SCARs disorders they trigger, the negative and positive predictive values for the drugs (where known), and the populations afflicted. Positive predictive values give the true percentages of individuals with the indicated HLA gene allele (identified as a serotype) that develop the cited drug-induced SCARs; negative predictive values give the percentage of individuals without the indicated serotype that fail to develop the cited drug-induced SCARs. For example, Chinese, Korean, Japanese, and European individuals that express the HLA-A31:01 allele have a 1% true chance of developing the DRESS syndrome while HLA-A31:01 negative individuals in these specific populations have a 99.9% true chance of not developing the DRESS syndrome when treated with carbamazepine. In this particular example, the HLA-A31:01 allele is virtually necessary but clearly not sufficient for developing the DRESS syndrome in response to carbamazepine. The table also shows that: positive predictive values lie between 0.59-55%, i.e. far below 100%; positive as well as negative predictive values vary with the population tested; a drug may cause more than one type of SCARs disorder or interact with more than one HLA serotype to cause SCARs; and the level of susceptibility to a drug varies between populations. These findings indicate that other factors, generally regarded as due to unspecified population-related genetic differences, contribute decisively to developing SCARs.

| Drug | Drug action | HLA gene and allele | SCARs disorder triggered | Positive predictive value | Negative predictive value | Populations afflicted |
|---|---|---|---|---|---|---|
| Carbamazepine | anticonvulsant | HLA-A*31:01 | DRESS syndrome | 1% | 99.9% | Chinese, Koreans, Japanese, European |
| Carbamazepine | anticonvulsant | HLA-A*31:01 | SJS, TEN, SJS/TEN | 0.89% | 99.98% | European |
| Carbamazepine | anticonvulsant | HLA-A*31:01 | SJS, TEN, SJS/TEN | 0.59% | 99.97% | Chinese |
| Carbamazepine | anticonvulsant | HLA-A*31:01 | SJS, TEN, SJS/TEN | ? | ? | Northern European, Japanese, Korean |
| Carbamazepine | anticonvulsant | HLA-B*15:02 | SJS, TEN, SJS/TEN | 3% | 100% | Chinese, Tai, Malaysian, Koreans, Indian |
| Carbamazepine | anticonvulsant | HLA-A*31:01 | MPE | 34/9% | 96.7% | Han Chinese |
| Oxcarbazepine | anticonvulsant | HLA-B*15:01 | SJS, TEN, SJS/TEN | ? | ? | Han Chinese, Taiwanese |
| Phenytoin | anticonvulsant | HLA-B*13:01 or HLA-B51:01 | DRESS syndrome, MPE | ? | ? | Han Chinese |
| Phenytoin | anticonvulsant | HLA-B*15:02, HLA-Cw*08:01, or HLA-DRB1*16:02 | DRESS syndrome | ? | ? | Han Chinese |
| Lamotrigine | anticonvulsant | HLA-B*15:02 or HLA-B*38 | SJS, TEN, SJS/TEN | ? | ? | Han Chinese |
| Lamotrigine | anticonvulsant | HLA-B*38, HLA-B*58:01, or HLA:68:01 | SJS, TEN, SJS/TEN | ? | ? | European |
| Lamotrigine | anticonvulsant | HLA-Cw*07, HLA-DQB*06:09, or HLA-DRB1*13:01 | SJS, TEN, SJS/TEN | ? | ? | European |
| Oxicam | anti-inflammatory | HLA-B*73, HLA-A*2, or HLA-B*12 | SJS, TEN, SJS/TEN | ? | ? | European |
| various sulfa drugs | antibiotic | HLA-Cw*4 | SJS, TEN, SJS/TEN | ? | ? | Han Chinese |
| various sulfa drugs | antibiotic | HLA-B*38 | SJS, TEN, SJS/TEN | ? | ? | European |
| Methazolamide | lowers intraocular pressure | HLA-B*59:01 or HLA-CW*01:02 | SJS, TEN, SJS/TEN | ? | ? | Korean, Japanese |
| Dapsone | antibiotic, anti-inflammatory | HLA-B*13:01 | DRESS syndrome | 7.8% | 99.8% | Han Chinese |
| Allopurinol | anti-gout drug | HLA-B*58:01 | DRESS syndrome, SJS, TEN, SJS/TEN | 3% | 100% in Han Chinese | Han Chinese, Korean, Thai, European |
| Nevirapine | anti-retroviral | HLA-DRB1*01:01 or HLA-DRB1*01:012 | DRESS syndrome | 18% | 96% | Australian, European, South African |
| Nevirapine | anti-retroviral | HLA-Cw*8 or HLA-Cw*8:-B*14 | DRESS syndrome | 18% | 96% | Italian, Japanese |
| Nevirapine | anti-retroviral | HLA-B*35, HLA-B*35:01, or HLA-B*35:05 | SJS, TEN, SJS/TEN | ? | ? | Asian |
| Nevirapine | anti-retroviral | HLA-C*04:01 | SJS, TEN, SJS/TEN | ? | ? | Malawian |
| Abacavir | anti-retroviral | HLA-B*57:01 | DRESS syndrome | 55% | 100% | European, African |

=== T-cell receptors ===
Due to gene editing. the number of diverse T-cell receptors expressed is estimated to be as high as 10 trillion. This has made it difficult to identify specific T-cell receptor types that are uniquely associated with the development of SCARs. One study, however, identified the preferential presence of the TCR-V-b and complementarity-determining region 3 in T-cell receptors found on the T cells in the blisters of patients with allopurinol-induced SCARs. This finding is compatible with the notion that specific types of T-cell receptors are involved in the development of specific drug-induced SCARs.

=== ADME ===
Certain variations in ADME (i.e. absorption, distribution, metabolism, and excretion of a drug) are associated with the development of SCARs. These variations influence the levels and duration of a drug or drug metabolite in tissues and thereby impact the drug's or drug metabolite's ability to evoke SCARs. A prominent example of an ADME-based genetic predisposition to SCARs involves the CYP2CP*3 allele of the CYP2C9 gene. CYP2C9, a cytochrome P450 enzyme, metabolizes various substances including phenytoin. The CYP2CP*3 variant of CYP29C has reduced catalytic activity. Individuals studied in Japan or Malaysia, and the Han Chinese in Taiwan that express this variant have an increased chance of developing the DRESS syndrome, SJS, SJS/TEN, or TEN when taking phenytoin while Africans in Mozambique expressing this variant taking phenytoin have an increase risk of developing SJS, SJS/TEN, or TEN. These reactions appear due to increases in the drug's blood and tissue levels. In a second example of a genetically based ADME defect causing SCARs, Japanese individuals bearing slow acetylating variants of the N-acetyltransferase 2 gene, (NAT2), viz., NAT2*6A and NAT2*7B, acetylate sulfasalazine more slowly than individuals homozygous for the wild type gene. Individuals expressing the NAT2*6A and NAT2*7 variants have an increased risk for developing a particularly severe form of the DRESS syndrome-like reactions to this anti-inflammatory drug. None-genetic ADME factors are also associated with increased risks of developing SCARs. For example, allopurinol is metabolized to oxipurinol, a product with a far slower renal excretion rate than its parent compound. Renal impairment is associated with abnormally high blood levels of oxipurinol and an increased risk of developing the DRESS syndrome, particularly the more severe forms of this disorder. Dysfunction of the kidney and liver are also suggested to promote SCARs responses to other drugs due to the accumulation of SCARs-inducing drugs or metabolites in blood and tissues. Currently, it is suspected that the expression of particular HLA proteins and T-cell receptors interact with ADME factors to promote SCARs particularly in their more serious forms.

=== Other factors ===
==== Virus reactivation ====
During the progression of the DRESS syndrome certain viruses which previously infected an individual and then became latent are reactivated and proliferate. Viruses known to do so include certain members of the Herpesviridae family of Herpes viruses viz., Epstein–Barr virus, human herpesvirus 6, human herpesvirus 7, and cytomegalovirus. Individuals suffering the DRESS syndrome may exhibit sequential reactivation of these four virus, typically in the order just given. Reactivation of these viruses is associated with sequential flare-ups in symptoms, a prolonged course, and increased disease severity which includes significant organ involvement and the development of certain autoimmune diseases viz., systemic lupus erythematosus, autoimmune thyroiditis, and type 1 diabetes mellitus. While these viral reactivations, particularly of human herpes virus 6, have been suggested to be an important factor in the pathogenesis of the DRESS syndrome, studies to date have not clearly determined if they are a cause or merely a consequence of T cell-mediated tissue injury. Rare case reports have associated the SJS/TEN spectrum of SCARs with reactivation of human herpesvirus 6; reactivation of cytomegalovirus has also been proposed to be associated with AGEP although a large study failed to observe the latter association. In all cases, the relationships of viral reactivation to the development and severity of any SCARs disorder is uncertain and requires further study.

==== Infections ====
Although more than 90% of AGEP are associated with the intake of a presumptively offending drug, reports have associated infection with Parvovirus B19, mycoplasma, cytomegalovirus, coxsackie B4 virus, Chlamydophila pneumoniae, E. coli, and Echinococcus with the drug-independent development of this disorder. The pathophysiology for the development of these drug-independent cases of AGEP is unclear. Viral infections have also been observed to be associated with the development of SJS, SJS/TEN, and TEN in the absence of a causative drug.

==== Autoimmune Disorders ====
Individuals suffering autoimmune disorders such as systemic lupus erythematosus may have an increased incidence of developing SCARs. While the cause for this possible predilection has not been determined, the altered immune system and the excessive production of cytokines occurring in these disorders could be contributing factors.

=== Effectors of tissue injury ===
The tissue injury in SCARs is initiated principally by CD8^{+} or CD4^{+} T cells. Once drug-activated, these lymphocytes elicit immune responses to self tissues that can result in SCARs drug reactions by mechanisms which vary with the type of disorder that develops. Salient elements mediating tissue injury for each type of disorder include:

- SJS, SJS/TEN, and TEN: These three SCARs are variants of a common epidermal necrolysis disorder that differ only in severity. Key down-stream elements that promote tissue injury in this spectrum of disorders are natural killer cells; death-inducing ligands that kill cells (viz., Fas ligand, TRAIL, and TNFSF12); cellular receptors for these ligands (viz., Fas receptor, death receptor 4, death receptor 5, and TNFRSF12A); cell-injuring proteins made by CD8^{+} and natural killer cells, (viz., granulysin, granzyme B, and perforin); and two cytokines that stimulate the proliferation and activation of natural killer and T cells (viz., interleukin 5 and annexin A1).
- DRESS syndrome: Key elements promoting tissue injury in the DRESS syndrome are: Th2 cells and eosinophils; and cytokiness which either activate eosinophils (viz.,. Interleukin 5), promote adaptive and allergic immune responses (viz., Interleukin 4), promote allergic responses and tissue fibrosis (viz., Interleukin 13), promote innate, adaptive, and auto-immune responses (viz., interferon gamma); or cause cell death (viz., tumor necrosis factor alpha).
- AGEP: Key elements promoting tissue injury in AGEP are: neutrophils; recruiters and activators of neutrophils (viz., Interleukin 8 and Interleukin 17); a promoter of innate immune and autoimmune responses (viz., Interleukin 22); and a cytokine which promotes the function of neutrophils, other granulocyte types, and monocytes as well as the production of these cells from their stem cells (viz., GM-CSF).

Future studies may find that drugs which neutralize one or more of these effectors to be useful for treating SCARs disorders.

== Prevention ==
Screening individuals for the expression of certain variant alleles of HLA genes before initiating treatment with particular SCARs-inducing drugs is recommended. These recommendations typically apply only to specific populations that have a significant chance of expressing the indicated variant since screening of populations with extremely low incidences of expressing the variant allele is considered cost-ineffective. Individuals expressing the HLA allele associated with sensitivity to an indicated drug should not be treated with the drug. These recommendations include:

- Carbamazepine: The Taiwan and USA Food and Drug Administrations recommend screening for HLA-B*15:02 in certain Asian groups before carbamazepine treatment. This has been implemented in Taiwan, Hong Kong, Singapore, and many medical centers in Thailand and Mainland China.
- Allopurinol: The American College of Rheumatology guidelines for the management of gout recommend HLA-B*58:01 screening before allopurinol treatment. This is provided in many medical centers in Taiwan, Hong Kong, Thailand, and Mainland China.
- Abacavir: The USA Food and Drug Administration recommends screening for HLA-B*57:01 in the treatment of HIV with abacovir in Caucasian populations. This screening is widely implemented. It has also been suggested that all individuals found to express this HLA serotype avoid treatment with abacovir.

Current trials are underway to evaluate the cost-effectiveness of genetic screening for HLA-B*13:01 to prevent dapsone-induced SCARs in China and Indonesia. Similar trials are underway in Taiwan to prevent phenytoin-induced SCARs in individuals expressing the CYP2C9*3 allele of CYP2C9 or a series of HLA alleles.
