= List of adverse effects of valproate semisodium =

Adverse effects by frequency for use of valproate semisodium.

== Very common (>10% frequency) ==
- Nausea
- Tremor

== Common (1-10% frequency) ==
- Liver injury
- Gastralgia
- Diarrhoea
- Extrapyramidal (movement) disorder
- Stupor (Note: Rare cases of lethargy occasionally progressing to stupor, sometimes with associated hallucinations or convulsions have been reported. Encephalopathy and coma have very rarely been observed. These cases are most often seen in association with other factors such as rapid dose escalations or withdrawal from other medications. They have usually been reversible on withdrawal of treatment or reduction of dosage.)
- Somnolence
- Convulsion
- Memory impairment
- Headache
- Nystagmus
- Confusional state
- Aggression (Note: These cases most commonly occur in the paediatric population.)
- Agitation
- Impaired attention
- Hyponatraemia
- Anaemia
- Thrombocytopaenia
- Hypersensitivity
- Transient and/or dose-related hair loss
- Dysmenorrhea
- Haemorrhage (bleeding)
- Weight gain (Note: Weight gain should be monitored closely as there is a potential link between weight gain and polyendocrine metabolic ovarian syndrome.)

== Uncommon (0.01-0.1% frequency) ==
- Pancreatitis (sometimes lethal)
- Coma
- Lethargy
- SIADH
- Pancytopenia
- Leucopenia
- Rash
- Angioedema
- Amenorrhoea (absence of menstrual cycle)
- Vasculitis
- Peripheral oedema
- Reduced bone mineral density
- Osteopaenia
- Osteoporosis
- Pleural effusions
- Gingival enlargement

== Rare (<0.01% frequency) ==
- Reversible dementia
- Reversible cerebral atrophy
- Abnormal behaviour
- Psychomotor hyperactivity
- Learning disorder
- Hyperammonaemia
- Hypothyroidism
- Bone marrow failure
- Toxic epidermal necrolysis
- Stevens–Johnson syndrome
- Erythema multiforme
- DRESS syndrome
- Male infertility
- Polycystic ovaries
- Enuresis
- Reversible Fanconi syndrome
- Coagulation abnormalities
- Systemic lupus erythematosus
- Gynaecomastia
