= Drug rash with eosinophilia and systemic symptoms =

Rare reaction to certain medications

- Other names: Drug induced hypersensitivity syndrome (DIHS), drug hypersensitivity syndrome (DHS), drug-induced delayed multiorgan hypersensitivity syndrome, drug-induced pseudolymphoma (formerly)
- Specialty: Dermatology, Immunology
- Symptoms: Rash, fever, sore throat, lymph node swelling, sores in mouth or other mucosal surfaces, facial swelling, itching
- Complications: Kidney damage, liver damage, heart damage, lung damage
- Usual onset: Usually 2-6 weeks after drug exposure
- Causes: Medication exposure
- Risk factors: Certain Human leukocyte antigen variants confer a greater risk after medication exposure
- Diagnostic method: Clinical diagnosis.
- Differential diagnosis: Stevens Johnson syndrome, Toxic epidermal necrolysis, Acute generalized exanthematous pustulosis
- Treatment: Discontinuing the offending medication, supportive care, glucocorticoids, Anti IL-5 antibodies, immunosuppressants
- Prognosis: Mortality rate varies, generally 1.2-7.1%, long term complications or disability is common
- Frequency: Incidence 1 case per 1,000 people to 1 case per 10,000 people

Drug rash with eosinophilia and systemic symptoms or drug reaction with eosinophilia and systemic symptoms (DRESS), also termed drug-induced hypersensitivity syndrome (DIHS), is a rare reaction to certain medications. It involves primarily a widespread skin rash, fever, swollen lymph nodes, and characteristic blood abnormalities such as an abnormally high level of eosinophils, low number of platelets, and increased number of atypical white blood cells (lymphocytes). DRESS usually involves damage to the internal organs via inflammation and the syndrome has about a 1.2-7% mortality rate. Treatment consists of stopping the offending medication and providing supportive care. Systemic corticosteroids are commonly used as well but no controlled clinical trials have assessed the efficacy of this treatment.

DRESS is classified as one form of severe cutaneous adverse reactions (SCARs). In addition to DRESS, SCARs includes four other drug-induced skin reactions: the Stevens–Johnson syndrome (SJS), toxic epidermal necrolysis (TEN), Stevens–Johnson/toxic epidermal necrolysis overlap syndrome (SJS/TEN) and acute generalized exanthematous pustulosis (AGEP). The SCARs disorders have similar disease mechanisms. New strategies are in use or development to screen individuals at risk for DRESS to aid them in avoiding medications that increase the risk of DRESS. Alternative medications are used in all individuals testing positive for these predispositions.

Prior to 1996, there were numerous reports on individuals presenting with a medication-induced disorder now recognized as the DRESS syndrome. For example, anticonvulsants in the 1930s, phenytoin in 1950, and other medications in the ensuing years were reported to do so. The reports often named the disorder based on the medication evoking it, e.g. the anticonvulsant hypersensitivity syndrome, allopurinol hypersensitivity syndrome, and dapsone hypersensitivity syndrome. In 1996, however, the term DRESS syndrome was coined in a report attempting to simplify the terminology and consolidate these various clearly related syndromes into a single underlying disorder.

DRESS syndrome is thought to be a T-cell mediated immunologic reaction. The incidence is estimated to be 1 case per 1,000 people to 1 case per 10,000 people. Worldwide mortality varies between 1.2-7.1%, with the mortality in the United States being approximately 5%.

== Signs and symptoms ==
DRESS syndrome usually begin 2 to 6 weeks but uncommonly up to 8–16 weeks after exposure to an offending drug. DRESS usually begin with a prodrome (early symptoms) of fever, malaise, sore throat with dysphagia, itching, and skin burning. This quickly progresses to a fever and a morbilliform, often itchy rash. The mobilliform rash in DRESS often begins in the trunk and face and spreads to include more than 50% of the body surface area. The rash in DRESS consist mainly of macules or plaques, facial edema (i.e. swelling, which is a hallmark of the disease), enlarged and sometimes painful lymph nodes and other symptoms due to inflammation of internal organ involvement, most commonly liver damage (and less commonly kidney, lung, heart, and rarely pancreatic damage). Most cases of DRESS have a generalized lymph node swelling, and this can precede the rash. Facial edema is characteristic of the disease and often presents with creases in the earlobes. Inflammation of the mucous membranes in DRESS usually involves the mouth (oropharynx), but 15% of cases have inflammation of multiple mucosal membranes.

Laboratory findings include increased blood eosinophil and atypical lymphocyte counts, elevated blood markers for systemic inflammation (e.g. erythrocyte sedimentation rate, C-reactive protein), and evidence of internal organ involvement. Liver involvement is detected by measuring blood levels of alanine aminotransferase (ALT), a marker of hepatocyte injury, and alkaline phosphatase (ALP), a marker of bile duct injury. Kidney involvement is more common in older adults and in those with prior kidney or cardiovascular disease. Kidney damage may take the form of severe interstitial nephritis, acute tubular necrosis, or vasculitis and may lead to kidney failure and death. Lung involvement takes the form of interstitial pneumonitis, pleuritis, or the acute respiratory distress syndrome; minocycline and abacavir are the main culprit drugs causing severe lung involvement. However, lung involvement in this disorder typically resolves. Cardiac involvement usually presents with evidence of left ventricular dysfunction and ECG changes; it occurs more often in individuals taking minocycline, ampicillin, or sulfonamides, and is either a cardiac hypersensitivity reaction classified as an eosinophilic myocarditis which generally resolves or a far more serious acute necrotizing eosinophilic myocarditis which has a mortality rate of more than 50%. Neurological manifestations of the DRESS syndrome include headache, seizure, coma, and motor dysfunction due to meningitis or encephalitis. Rare manifestations of the disorder include inflammation of the pancreas, gastrointestinal tract, and spleen.

The following table gives the percentages for organ involvement and blood abnormalities found in individuals with the DRESS syndrome based on various studies. There are large variations in the percentages found in different studies and populations.

| Organ | Percentage involvement | Comment | Blood abnormality | Percentage involvement | Comment |
|---|---|---|---|---|---|
| Liver | 59-100% | >90% if based on high blood levels of ALT | Eosinophilia | 30-95% | usually seen in >66% of cases |
| Kidney | 8-40% | >40% if based on high levels of BUN or creatinine | Atypical blood lymphocytosis | 27-67% | - |
| Lung | 5-33% | usually resolves | Lymphocytosis | ~3% | - |
| Heart (hypersensitivity reaction) | 2-15% | generally not life-threatening | Leukocytosis | up to 100% | due to eosinophilia and/or lymphocytosis |
| Heart (necrotizing eosinophilic myocarditis) | 2-15% | mortality> 50% | Thrombocytopenia | 3% | Thrombocytopenia may precede and not be due to DRESS syndrome |
| Nervous system | ~5% | usually resolves | Elevated ESR | ~60-70% | marker of systemic inflammation |
| Pancreas | ~5% | may result in diabetes | Elevated C-reactive protein | ~60% | marker of systemic inflammation |

Tests to determine the causative agent are not available. No gold standard exists for diagnosis, and at least two diagnostic criteria have been proposed, the RegiSCAR criteria and the Japanese consensus group criteria.

| RegiSCAR inclusion criteria for DRESS syndrome: 3 of the 4 starred criteria are required for diagnosis | Japanese consensus group diagnostic criteria for DIHS: 7 criteria are needed for diagnosis of DIHS or the first 5 criteria required for diagnosis of atypical DIHS. |
|---|---|
| Hospitalization | pruritic, macular erythema containing papules, pustules or vesicles (generally a Maculopapular rash), developing >3 weeks after starting suspected drug |
| Reaction suspected to be drug-related | Prolonged clinical symptoms 2 weeks after discontinuation of the suspected drug |
| Acute Rash* | Fever > 38 °C |
| Fever > 38 °C* | Liver abnormalities (ALT > 100 U/L) or other organ involvement |
| Lymphadenopathy in at least two sites* | Leukocyte abnormalities |
| Involvement of at least one internal organ* | Leukocytosis ( > 11 × 10^{9}/l) |
| Blood count abnormalities (lymphopenia or lymphocytosis*, eosinophilia*, thrombocytopenia*) | Atypical lymphocytosis (>5%) |
| Severe nerve pain | Lymphadenopathy |
| | Human herpesvirus 6 reactivation |

== Causes ==
=== Medications ===
Drugs that commonly induce DRESS syndrome arranged according to intended clinical action include the following:

- Anticonvulsants: Carbamazepine, lamotrigine, phenobarbital, phenytoin, oxcarbazepine, gabapentin, primidone
- Antibacterial: Amoxicillin, ampicillin, azithromycin, levofloxacin, minocycline, piperacillin/tazobactam combination, vancomycin, streptomycin
- Anti-tubercular: Ethambutol, isoniazid, pyrazinamide, rifampin
- Anti-retroviral: Abacavir, nevirapine
- Anti-hepatitis C: Boceprevir, telaprevir
- Anti-inflammatory: Acetaminophen, diclofenac, celecoxib, ibuprofen
- Sulfa drugs: Dapsone, sulfamethoxazole-trimethoprim combination, sulfasalazine
- Anticancer drugs: Sorafenib, vismodegib, vemurafenib, imatinib,
- Other drugs: Allopurinol (inhibits uric acid production; treatment for gout), mexiletine (treatment for heart arrhythmias), omeprazole (treatment for gastroesophageal reflux and peptic ulcer), Strontium ranelate (osteoporosis treatment), Chinese herbal medicine.

Medications associated with the development of DRESS are widely used and clinically important for the treatment certain diseases. Aromatic anticonvulsants (known for having a 6-carbon aromatic ring as part of their structure, and commonly used to treat seizures are the most commonly implicated medications. This includes the anticonvulsants lamotrigine, phenytoin, carbamazepine, and oxcarbazepine. Other common cuprits include the gout medication allopurinol and the antibiotics vancomycin and trimethoprim-sulfamethoxazole. In the United States, the five most common culprit medications, in order of decreasing incidence are: allopurinol, vancomycin, lamotrigine, carbamazepine, and trimethoprim-sulfamethoxazole.

Less common culprit medications include minocycline, sulfasalazine, strontium ranelate, leflunomide, dapsone, and nonsteroidal anti-inflammatory drugs (diclofenac, celecoxib, and ibuprofen).

=== Genetics ===
Studies have found that certain populations that express particular serotypes (i.e. alleles) of HLA-A, HLA-B, and/or HLA-C have an increased risk of developing the DRESS syndrome in response to specific medications. These associations include the following:

- Carbamazepine: Chinese, Koreans, Japanese, and European individuals who express the HLA serotype termed HLA-A31:01 have a low (~1%) but far higher risk of developing the syndrome in response to carbamazepine. Japanese expressing the serotypes HLA-A11 or HLA-B51 also have increased risks of developing it in response to Carbamazepine.
- Phenytoin: Han Chinese individuals expressing HLA-B13:01, HLA-B51:01, HLA-B15:02, HLA-Cw*08:01, or HLA-DRB1*16:02 serotypes have higher risks of developing the syndrome in response to phenytoin.
- Dapsone: Han Chinese individuals expressing the HLA-B13:01 serotype have a higher risk (7.8%) of developing the DRESS syndrome in response to dapsone.
- Allopurinol: Han Chinese, Korean, Thai, and European individuals expressing the HLA-B58:01 serotype have a higher incidence of developing the syndrome in response to allopurinol.
- Nevirapine: Africans, Asians, and Europeans expressing HLA-DRB1:01:01 or HLA-DRB1:01:02, or HLA-Cw4 serotypes, Asians expressing the HLA-B35 serotype and Australians and Europeans expressing the HLA-C04 serotype have higher incidences of developing the syndrome in response to nevirapine.
- Abacavir: European and African individuals expressing the HLA-B57:01 serotype have a higher incidence (55%) of developing the syndrome in response to abacavir.
- Vancomycin: European individuals carrying HLA-A*32:01 have an approximately 20% chance of developing DRESS syndrome after more than 2 weeks of vancomycin

== Pathophysiology ==
=== Human leukocyte antigens ===
Like other drug-induced SCARs disorders, the DRESS syndrome is a type IV hypersensitivity reaction in which a drug or its metabolite stimulates cytotoxic T cells (i.e. CD8^{+} T cells) or T helper cells (i.e. CD4^{+} T cells) to initiate autoimmune reactions that attack self tissues. DRESS syndrome is a SCARs type IV, subtype IVb reaction. This contrasts with SJS, SJS/TEN, and TEN which are type IV, subtype IVc reactions and AGEP which is a type IV subtype IVd reaction. DRESS syndrome therefore differs from the other SCARs disorders in that it involves the tissue-injuring action of CD4^{+} cells and the cell- and tissue-injuring action of eosinophils as well as the release of the following cytokines: Interleukins 5 and 13 which simulate the growth, longevity, and activation of eosinophils; Interleukin 4 which promotes the differentiation of naive helper T cells into T_{h}2 helper cells that then serve to activate eosinophils as well as other types of pro-inflammatory cells; IFNγ which activates macrophages and induces the expression of Class II MHC molecules; and TNFα which promotes inflammation but also has cell-killing actions.

Like other SCARs-inducing drugs, DRESS syndrome-inducing drugs or their metabolites stimulate CD8^{+} T or CD4^{+} T cells to initiate autoimmune responses. Studies indicate that the mechanism by which a drug or its metabolites accomplishes this stimulation involves subverting the antigen presentation pathways of the innate immune system. The drug or metabolite covalently binds with a host protein to form a non-self, drug-related epitope. An antigen-presenting cell (APC) takes up these alter proteins; digests them into small peptides; places the peptides in a groove on the human leukocyte antigen (i.e. HLA) component of their major histocompatibility complex (i.e. MHC); and presents the MHC-associated peptides to the T-cell receptor on CD8^{+} T or CD4^{+} T cells. Those peptides expressing a drug-related, non-self epitope on their HLA-A, HLA-B, HLA-C, HLA-DM, HLA-DO, HLA-DP, HLA-DQ, or HLA-DR proteins may bind to a T-cell receptor to stimulate the receptor-bearing parent T cell to initiate attacks on self tissues. Alternatively, a drug or metabolite may stimulate these T cells by inserting into the groove on a HLA protein to serve as a non-self epitope or bind outside of this groove to alter a HLA protein so that it forms a non-self epitope. Importantly, however, non-self epitopes must bind to specific HLA serotypes in order to stimulate T cells. Since the human population expresses some 13,000 different HLA serotypes while an individual expresses only a fraction of them and since a DRESSs-inducing drug or metabolite interacts with only one or a few HLA serotypes, a drug's ability to induce SCARs is limited to those individuals who express HLA serotypes targeted by the drug or its metabolite. Thus, only rare individuals are predisposed to develop SCARs in response to a particular drug on the basis of their expression of HLA serotypes. Studies have identified several HLA serotypes associated with development of the DRESS syndrome in response to certain drugs, have developed tests to identify individuals who express some of these serotypes, and thereby have identified individuals who should avoid certain DRESS syndrome-inducing drugs.

=== T-cell receptors ===
A drug or its metabolite may also stimulate CD8^{+} T or CD4^{+} T cells to initiate autoimmune responses by directly binding to the T-cell receptors on these T cells. Again, this binding appears to develop only on certain T-cell receptors. Since the genes for these receptors are highly edited, i.e. altered to encode proteins with different amino acid sequences, and since the human population may express more than 100 trillion different (i.e. different amino acid sequences) T-cell receptors while an individual express only a fraction of these, a drug's or its metabolite's ability to induce the DRESS syndrome by interacting with a T-cell receptor is limited to those individuals whose T cells express a T-cell receptor(s) that can interact with drug or its metabolite. Thus, only rare individuals are predisposed to develop a SCARs disorder in response to a particular drug on the basis of their expression of specific cell receptor types. While the evidence supporting these ideas is limited, one study identified the preferential presence of the TCR-V-b and complementarity-determining region 3 in T-cell receptors found on the T cells in the blisters of patients with allopurinol-induced DRESS syndrome. This finding is compatible with the notion that specific types of T-cell receptors are involved in the development of specific drug-induced SCARs.

=== ADME ===
Variations in ADME, i.e. an individual's efficiency in absorbing, distributing, metabolizing, and excreting a drug has been found to occur in cases of the DRESS syndrome. These variations influence the levels and duration of a drug or drug metabolite in tissues and thereby impact the drug's or drug metabolite's ability to evoke the DRESS syndrome. For example, the CYP2C9 gene codes for CYP2C9, a cytochrome P450 enzyme which metabolizes various substances including phenytoin. The CYP2CP*3 variant of CYP29C has reduced catalytic activity; individuals expressing this variant show an increased incidence of developing the DRESS syndrome when taking phenytoin apparently due to increases in the drug's blood and tissue levels. In a second example of a genetically based ADME defect causing SCARs, Japanese individuals bearing slow acetylating variants of the N-acetyltransferase 2 gene, (NAT2), viz., NAT2*6A and NAT2*7B, acetylate sulfasalazine more slowly than individuals homozygous for the wild type gene. Individuals expressing the NAT2*6A and NAT2*7 variants have an increased risk for developing DRESS syndrome-like reactions to this anti-inflammatory drug. None-genetic ADME factors are also associated with increased risks of developing the DRESS syndrome. Allopurinol is metabolized to oxipurinol, a product with a far slower renal excretion rate than its parent compound. Renal impairment is associated with abnormally high blood levels of oxipurinol and an increased risk of developing the DRESS syndrome, particularly the more severe forms of this disorder. Dysfunction of the kidney and liver are also suggested to promote this disorder in response to other drugs due to the accumulation of SCARs-inducing drugs or metabolites in blood and tissues. Currently, it is suspected that the expression of particular HLA proteins and T-cell receptors interact with ADME factors to promote SCARs particularly in their more serious forms.

=== Viral reactivation ===
During the progression of the DRESS syndrome certain viruses that previously infected an individual and then became latent are reactivated and proliferate. Viruses known to do so include certain members of the Herpesviridae family of Herpes viruses viz., Epstein–Barr virus, human herpesvirus 6, human herpesvirus 7, and cytomegalovirus. Individuals with DRESS syndrome may exhibit sequential reactivation of these four viruses, typically in the order just given. Reactivation of these viruses is associated with a flare-up in symptoms, a prolonged course, and increased disease severity which includes significant organ involvement and the development of certain autoimmune diseases viz., systemic lupus erythematosus, autoimmune thyroiditis, and type 1 diabetes mellitus. While these viral reactivations, particularly of human herpes virus 6, have been suggested to be an important factor in the pathogenesis of the DRESS syndrome, studies to date have not clearly determined if they are a cause or merely a consequence of T cell-mediated tissue injury.

== Preventative ==
Currently, screening individuals for the expression of certain HLA alleles before initiating treatment of patients with DRESS-inducing drugs is recommended. These recommendations typically apply only to specific populations that have a significant chance of expressing the indicated allele since screening of populations with extremely low incidences of expressing an allele is considered cost-ineffective. Individuals expressing the HLA allele associated with sensitivity to an indicated drug should not be treated with the drug. These recommendations include:

- Allopurinol: The American College of Rheumatology guidelines for the management of gout recommend HLA-B*58:01 screening before allopurinol treatment.
- Abacavir: The USA Food and Drug Administration and recommends screening for HLA-B*57:01 in the treatment of HIV with abacavir in Caucasian populations. It has also been suggested that all individuals found to express this HLA serotype avoid treatment with abacavir.

Current trials are underway to evaluate the ability of genetic screening to prevent the DRESS syndrome for dapsone and HLA-B*13:01 in China and Indonesia. Similar trials are underway in Taiwan to prevent phenytoin-induced DRESS syndrome in individuals expressing the CYP2C9*3 allele of CYP2C9 as well as a series of HLA alleles.

== Treatment ==
Quickly stopping the offending drug is the first and critical step in treating DRESS. Intravenous glucocorticoids are used in the treatment of DRESS syndrome but the dosage and regiment is not well established. Glucocorticoids are generally slowly tapered (over many weeks to months) when the clinical course improves. Intravenous immune globulin (IVIG) and immunosuppressants including mycophenolate mofetil, cyclosporin, and cyclophosphamide have also been used. Cyclosporine blocks T-cell activating cytokines including Il-5. The anti-IL-5 antibodies mepolizumab, reslizumab, and benralizumab have also been used to treat DRESS, and these drugs can be added to glucocorticoids if the treatment response is inadequate.

Disease relapses may occur after the steroid taper or remotely, after treatment completion.

Less severe cases of this disorder may be treated conservatively with general support and topical glucocorticoids for the skin manifestations.

== Terminology ==
DRESS syndrome is one of several terms that have been used to describe a severe idiosyncratic reaction to a drug that is characterized by a long latency of onset after exposure to the offending medication, a rash, involvement of internal organs, hematologic abnormalities, and systemic illness. Other synonymous names and acronyms include drug-induced hypersensitivity syndrome (DIHS or DHiS), anticonvulsant hypersensitivity syndrome, drug-induced delayed multiorgan hypersensitivity syndrome, drug-induced pseudolymphoma, anticonvulsant hypersensitivity syndrome, allopurinol hypersensitivity syndrome, dapsone syndrome, and dapsone hypersensitivity syndrome.

== See also ==
- Severe cutaneous adverse reactions
- Adverse drug reaction
- Drug allergy
- Drug intolerance
- Drug tolerance
- List of skin conditions
- Eosinophilic myocarditis associated with the DRESS syndrome
