= CW4 =

CW4 may refer to:

== U.S. television stations affiliated with The CW network ==
=== Current ===
==== Owned-and-operated ====
- KGBT-TV in Harlingrn-McAllen-Brownsville, Texas
- KRON-TV in San Francisco, California

==== Affiliates ====
- KCWO-TV in Big Spring–Odessa–Midland, Texas
- KTIV-DT2 in Sioux City, Iowa
- KTKB-LD in Tamuning, Guam (cable channel; broadcasts on channel 26)
- WOAI-TV-DT2 in San Antonio, Texas

=== Former ===
- KOMO-TV-DT2 in Seattle, Washington (2023–2024)
- KXLF-TV-DT2 in Butte, Montana (2006–2023)
- WCBI-TV-DT3 in Columbus, Mississippi (2006–2024)
- WMOW in Wausau, Wisconsin (2010–2021)
- WTTV in Bloomington–Indianapolis, Indiana (2006–2014)

== Other uses ==
- CW4, a postcode district in the CW postcode area
- Chief Warrant Officer 4, a rank of Warrant Officer (United States) in the United States military
- HLA-Cw4 is a serotype within the HLA-C serotype group
