= SCORTEN scale =

Medical assessment score

The SCORTEN scale (SCORe of Toxic Epidermal Necrosis) is a severity-of-illness scale with which the severity of certain bullous conditions can be systematically determined. It was originally developed for toxic epidermal necrolysis, but can be used with burn victims, sufferers of Stevens–Johnson syndrome, cutaneous drug reactions, or exfoliative wounds. These conditions have in common that they compromise the integrity of the skin and/or mucous membranes.

In the SCORTEN Scale 7 independent risk factors for high mortality are systematically scored, so as to determine the mortality rate for that particular patient.

| Risk factor | 0 | 1 |
|---|---|---|
| Age | < 40 years | > 40 years |
| Associated malignancy | no | yes |
| Heart rate (beats/min) | <120 | >120 |
| Serum BUN (mg/dL) | <28 | >28 |
| Detached or compromised body surface | <10% | >10% |
| Serum bicarbonate (mEq/L) | >20 | <20 |
| Serum glucose (mg/dL) | <252 | >252 |

The more risk factors present, the higher the SCORTEN score, and the higher the mortality rate, as shown in the following table.

| No of risk factors | Mortality rate |
|---|---|
| 0-1 | 3.2% |
| 2 | 12.1% |
| 3 | 35.3% |
| 4 | 58.3% |
| 5 or more | >90% |

== See also ==
- Stevens–Johnson syndrome
