= Asboe-Hansen sign =

The Asboe-Hansen sign (also known as "indirect Nikolsky sign'" or "Nikolsky II sign") refers to the extension of a large blister to adjacent unblistered skin when pressure is put on the top of it. It is seen along with Nikolsky's sign, both used to assess the severity of some blistering diseases such as pemphigus vulgaris and severe bullous drug reactions.

This sign is named for the Danish physician Gustav Asboe-Hansen (1917–1989), who first described it in 1960.

It is considered an indirect diagnostic tool in toxic epidermal necrolysis (TEN).

== See also ==
- List of cutaneous conditions
