= Alan Lyell =

Scottish dermatologist

- Born: 4 November 1917; India
- Died: 2 November 2007 (aged 89)
- Citizenship: Scottish
- Known for: toxic epidermal necrolysis (less commonly referred to as Lyell's syndrome)
- Scientific career
- Fields: dermatology

Alan Lyell (4 November 1917 – 2 November 2007) was a Scottish dermatologist who described Lyell's syndrome.
