= Pyotr Nikolsky =

Russian dermatologist (1858–1940)

Pyotr Vasilyevich Nikolsky (Russian: Пётр Васи́льевич Нико́льский; September 13 [O.S. September 1] 1858 – March 13, 1940) was an Imperial Russian and later Soviet dermatologist. He was born in Usman, Tambov Governorate, Russian Empire and earned his medical degree from the Saint Vladimir Imperial University of Kyiv in 1884. After graduating, he studied under Mikhail Stukovenkov at the Department of Dermatology and Venerology in Kyiv. In 1896, he defended his doctoral thesis on pemphigus foliaceus, in which he described a dermatological condition involving a weakening relationship among the epidermal layers. The sloughing of skin associated with certain varieties of this condition is now referred to as Nikolsky's sign. In 1898, he became a professor at the Imperial University of Warsaw, and later established the Department of Dermatology and Venerology in Rostov at what is now Rostov State Medical University.

He published articles in French as well as Russian on skin diseases and on the treatment of syphilis. He was the author of L'etat de la dermatologie et de la syphiligraphie en Russie jusqu'à 1884 (The State of Dermatology and Syphiligraphy in Russia up until 1884).
