= Nikolsky's sign =

Medical sign of skin layers being easily rubbed off

- Specialty: Dermatology
- Differential diagnosis: Stevens–Johnson syndrome

Nikolsky's sign is a clinical dermatological sign, named after Pyotr Nikolsky (1858–1940), a Russian physician who trained and worked in the Russian Empire. The sign is present when slight rubbing of the skin results in exfoliation of the outermost layer. A typical test would be to place the eraser of a pencil on the roof of a lesion and spin the pencil in a rolling motion between the thumb and forefinger. If the lesion is opened (i.e., skin sloughed off), then the Nikolsky's sign is present/positive.

Nikolsky's sign is almost always present in Stevens–Johnson syndrome/toxic epidermal necrolysis and staphylococcal scalded skin syndrome, caused by the exfoliative toxin of Staphylococcus aureus. It is also associated with pemphigus vulgaris and pemphigus foliaceus. It is useful in differentiating between the diagnosis of pemphigus vulgaris or mucous membrane pemphigoid (where the sign is present) and bullous pemphigoid (where it is absent). The Nikolsky sign is dislodgement of intact superficial epidermis by a shearing force, indicating a plane of cleavage in the skin epidermal-epidermal junctions (e.g., desmosomes). The histological picture involves thinner, weaker attachments of the skin lesion itself to the normal skin – resulting in easier dislodgement.

The formation of new blisters upon slight pressure (direct Nikolsky) and shearing of the skin due to rubbing (indirect Nikolsky) is a sign of pemphigus vulgaris, albeit not a 100% reliable diagnosis. In addition, another physical exam, the Asboe-Hansen signs, must be used to determine the absence of intracellular connections holding epidermal cells together.

== See also ==
- Chronic blistering skin diseases
- List of cutaneous conditions
