= Denudation (medicine) =

Medical term

In medicine, denudation refers to the loss of surface layers, such as the epithelium. Denudation coupled with peeling and cracking of skin gives rise to a "crazy pavement dermatosis" pattern seen in Kwashiorkor or Kwashiorkor-Marasmus complex.

In occupational asthma, the denudation of the bronchial mucosa can occur in the setting of nonimmunologic exposures (i.e., chemical spill, chlorine, ammonia), causing irritation.

Clostridioides difficile is known to cause formation of pseudomembranes in the intestines that is formed by denuded epithelium, neutrophilic infiltrate, fibrin, and bacteria due to the effects of its toxins: Toxin A (TcdA) and Toxin B (TcdB), which disrupt cellular cytoskeletons and tight junctions leading to cell death.
