= Chlormezanone =

Withdrawn anxiolytic and muscle relaxant

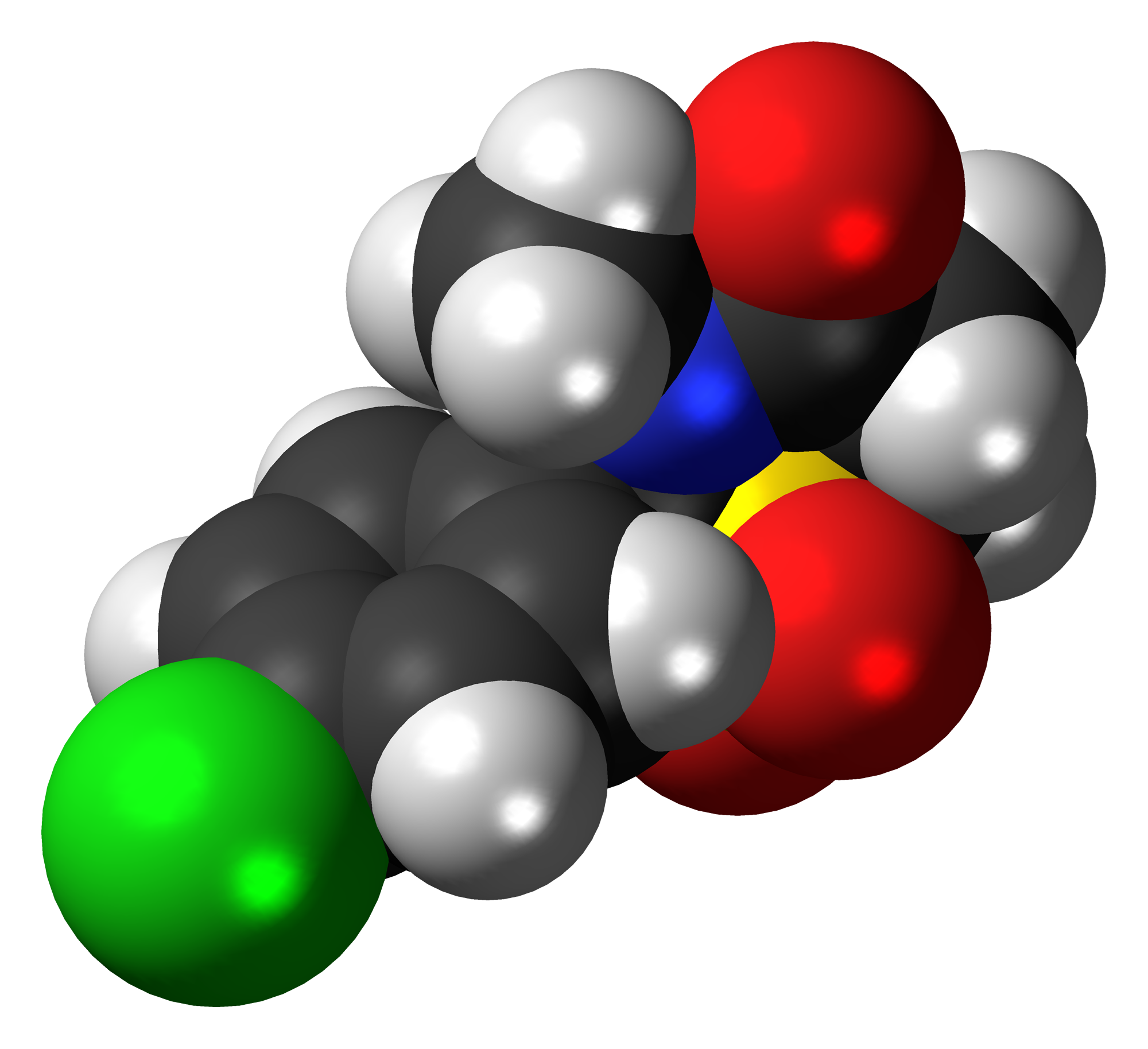

Clinical data
- AHFS/Drugs.com: International Drug Names
- Routes of administration: Oral
- ATC code: M03BB02 (WHO)

Legal status
- Legal status: In general: ℞ (Prescription only)

Pharmacokinetic data
- Elimination half-life: 40.5 hours

Identifiers
- IUPAC name: 2-(4-chlorophenyl)-3-methyl-1,1-dioxo-1,3-thiazinan-4-one
- CAS Number: 80-77-3
- PubChem CID: 2717
- IUPHAR/BPS: 7323
- DrugBank: DB01178
- ChemSpider: 2616
- UNII: GP568V9G19
- KEGG: D00268
- ChEBI: CHEBI:3619
- ChEMBL: ChEMBL1200714
- CompTox Dashboard (EPA): DTXSID3022798
- ECHA InfoCard: 100.001.190

Chemical and physical data
- Formula: C_{11}H_{12}ClNO_{3}S
- Molar mass: 273.73 g·mol^{−1}
- 3D model (JSmol): Interactive image
- SMILES: O=S1(CCC(N(C)C1C2=CC=C(C=C2)Cl)=O)=O
- InChI: InChI=1S/C11H12ClNO3S/c1-13-10(14)6-7-17(15,16)11(13)8-2-4-9(12)5-3-8/h2-5,11H,6-7H2,1H3; Key:WEQAYVWKMWHEJO-UHFFFAOYSA-N

Chlormezanone (marketed under the brandname Trancopal or Fenaprim) is a drug used as an anxiolytic and a muscle relaxant.

Its use was discontinued in many countries in 1996 due to rare but serious cases of toxic epidermal necrolysis.

== Synthesis ==
Chlormezanone synthesis
