= HLA-B13 =

Human leukocyte antigen serotype

major histocompatibility complex (human), class I, B13
Alleles	B*1301, *1302
Structure (See HLA-B)
Symbol(s)	HLA-B
EBI-HLA	B*1301
EBI-HLA	B*1302
Locus	chr.6 6p21.31

HLA-B13 (B13) is an HLA-B serotype. The serotype identifies the more common HLA-B*13 gene products. (For terminology help see: HLA-serotype tutorial)

== Serotype ==
B13 serotype recognition of Some HLA B*13 allele-group gene products
B*13	B13		Sample
allele	%	%	size (N)
1301	97		238
1302	99		1307

== Allele frequencies ==
HLA B*1301 frequencies
		freq
ref.	Population	(%)
	Papua New Guinea Wosera	28.3
	Australian Aborigine Cape York Peninsula	27.0
	Taiwan Bunun	26.7
	Australian Aborigine Groote Eylandt	23.3
	Taiwan Thao	21.7
	Taiwan Tsou	17.6
	India Khandesh Pawra	12.0
	China South Han	8.2
	New Caledonia	7.7
	South Africa Natal Tamil	6.1
	Philippines Ivatan	6.0
	Papua New Guinea Eastern Highlands Goroka	5.7
	Singapore Riau Malay	5.4
	China North Han	4.8
	Thailand	4.1
	India West Coast Parsis	3.0
	India North Hindus	2.9
	Jordan Amman	2.1
	South Korea (3)	2.1
	Thailand	2.1
	China Inner Mongolia	2.0
	France South East	1.9
	Georgia Tbilisi Kurds	1.7
	Japan Central	1.5
	India Andhra Pradesh Golla	1.4
	India North Delhi	1.1
	B*1302
	India West Coast Parsis	16.0
	Cameroon Bakola Pygmy	7.0
	Czech Republic	6.6
	Georgia Svaneti Svans	6.3
	Georgia Tbilisi Georgians	5.6
	India Mumbai Marathas	4.3
	Romanian	4.1
	India West Bhils	4.0
	China North Han	3.8
	Sudanese	3.8
	South Korea pop 3	3.5
	Georgia Tbilisi Kurds	3.4
	Russia Tuva pop 2	3.3
	Israel Arab Druse	3.0
	Central Africa Republic Mbenzele Pygmy	2.8
	Israel Ashkenazi and Non Ashkenazi Jews	2.8
	Uganda Kampala	2.8
	Bulgaria	2.7
	Cameroon Yaounde	2.7
	Guinea Bissau	2.3
	Kenya Nandi	2.3
	India North Delhi	2.2
	Zimbabwe Harare Shona	2.2
	Kenya	2.1
	Croatia	2.0
	Cameroon Bamileke	1.9
	USA North American Natives	1.9
	China South Han	1.8
	Finland	1.7
	Belgium	1.5
	South African Natal Zulu	1.5
	Tunisia	1.5
	India Andhra Pradesh Golla	1.4
	Azores Santa Maria and Sao Miguel	1.3
	Ireland South	1.2
	Singapore Chinese Han	1.2
	Kenya Luo	1.1
	Mexico Chihuahua State Tarahumara	1.1
	Tunisia Tunis	1.1
	Zambia Lusaka	1.1
	Portugal Centre	1.0
	Saudi Arabia Guraiat and Hail	1.0
	Singapore Javanese Indonesians	1.0
