= HLA-B35 =

Human leukocyte antigen serotype

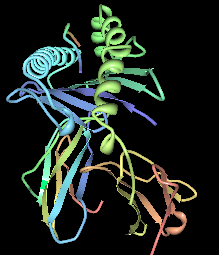
B*3508-β2MG with bound peptide
2h6p
major histocompatibility complex (human), class I, B35
Alleles	B*3501, 3502, 3503, . . .
Structure (See HLA-B)
Symbol(s)	HLA-B	2fyy, 2fz3
EBI-HLA	B*3501	2h6p, 2cik, 1a1n
EBI-HLA	B*3502
EBI-HLA	B*3503
EBI-HLA	B*3504
EBI-HLA	B*3505
EBI-HLA	B*3506
EBI-HLA	B*3507
EBI-HLA	B*3508	2nw3, 2nx5
EBI-HLA	B*3509
EBI-HLA	B*3510
EBI-HLA	B*3511
EBI-HLA	B*3512
Locus	chr.6 6p21.31

HLA-B35 (B35) is an HLA-B serotype. The serotype identifies the more common HLA-B*35 gene products. B35 is one of the largest B serotype groups, it currently has 97 known nucleotide variants and 86 polypeptide isoforms. (For terminology help see: HLA-serotype tutorial). This variant is particularly susceptible to HIV infection.

== Serotype ==
B35 serotype recognition of Some HLA B*35 allele-group gene products
B*35	B35		Sample
allele	%	%	size (N)
3501	98		2023
3502	72		1013
3503	94		1226
3504	100		26
3505	94		231
3506	79		10
3508	91		349
3509	68		3
3510	75		12
3511	67		17
3512	78		422
3514	79		29
3520	42		23
