= Stevens–Johnson syndrome =

Skin disease

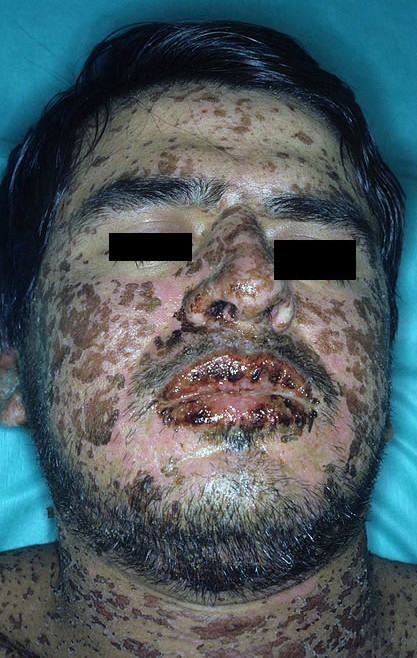
- Man with characteristic skin lesions of Stevens–Johnson syndrome
- Specialty: Dermatology
- Symptoms: Fever, skin blisters, skin peeling, painful skin, red eyes
- Complications: Dehydration, sepsis, pneumonia, multiple organ failure.
- Usual onset: Age < 30
- Causes: Certain medications, certain infections, unknown
- Risk factors: HIV/AIDS, systemic lupus erythematosus, genetics, certain medications
- Diagnostic method: <10% of the skin involved, skin biopsy
- Differential diagnosis: Chickenpox, staphylococcal epidermolysis, staphylococcal scalded skin syndrome, autoimmune bullous disease, smallpox
- Treatment: Hospitalization, stopping the cause
- Medication: Pain medication, antihistamines, antibiotics, corticosteroids, intravenous immunoglobulins
- Prognosis: Mortality ~7.5%
- Frequency: 1–2 per million per year (together with TEN)

Stevens–Johnson syndrome (SJS) is a type of severe skin reaction. Together with toxic epidermal necrolysis (TEN) and Stevens–Johnson/toxic epidermal necrolysis (SJS/TEN) overlap, they are considered febrile mucocutaneous drug reactions and probably part of the same spectrum of disease, with SJS being less severe. Erythema multiforme (EM) is generally considered a separate condition. Early symptoms of SJS include fever and flu-like symptoms. A few days later, the skin begins to blister and peel, forming painful raw areas. Mucous membranes, such as the mouth, are also typically involved. Complications include dehydration, sepsis, pneumonia and multiple organ failure.

The most common cause is certain medications such as lamotrigine, carbamazepine, allopurinol, sulfonamide antibiotics and nevirapine. Other causes can include infections such as Mycoplasma pneumoniae and cytomegalovirus, or the cause may remain unknown. Risk factors include HIV/AIDS and systemic lupus erythematosus.

The diagnosis of Stevens–Johnson syndrome is based on involvement of less than 10% of the skin. It is known as TEN when more than 30% of the skin is involved and considered an intermediate form when 10–30% is involved. SJS/TEN reactions are believed to follow a type IV hypersensitivity mechanism. It is also included with drug reaction with eosinophilia and systemic symptoms (DRESS syndrome), acute generalized exanthematous pustulosis (AGEP) and toxic epidermal necrolysis in a group of conditions known as severe cutaneous adverse reactions (SCARs).

Treatment typically takes place in hospital such as in a burn unit or intensive care unit. Efforts may include stopping the cause, pain medication, antihistamines, antibiotics, intravenous immunoglobulins or corticosteroids. Together with TEN, SJS affects 1 to 2 people per million per year. Typical onset is under the age of 30. Skin usually regrows over two to three weeks; however, complete recovery can take months. Overall, the risk of death with SJS is 5 to 10%.

== Signs and symptoms ==
SJS usually begins with fever, sore throat, and fatigue, which is commonly misdiagnosed and therefore treated with antibiotics. SJS, SJS/TEN, and TEN are often heralded by fever, sore throat, cough, and burning eyes for 1 to 3 days. Patients with these disorders frequently experience burning pain of their skin at the start of disease. Ulcers and other lesions begin to appear in the mucous membranes, almost always in the mouth and lips, but also in the genital and anal regions. Those in the mouth are usually extremely painful and reduce the patient's ability to eat or drink. Conjunctivitis occurs in about 30% of children who develop SJS. A rash of round lesions about an inch across arises on the face, trunk, arms and legs, and soles of the feet, but usually not the scalp.

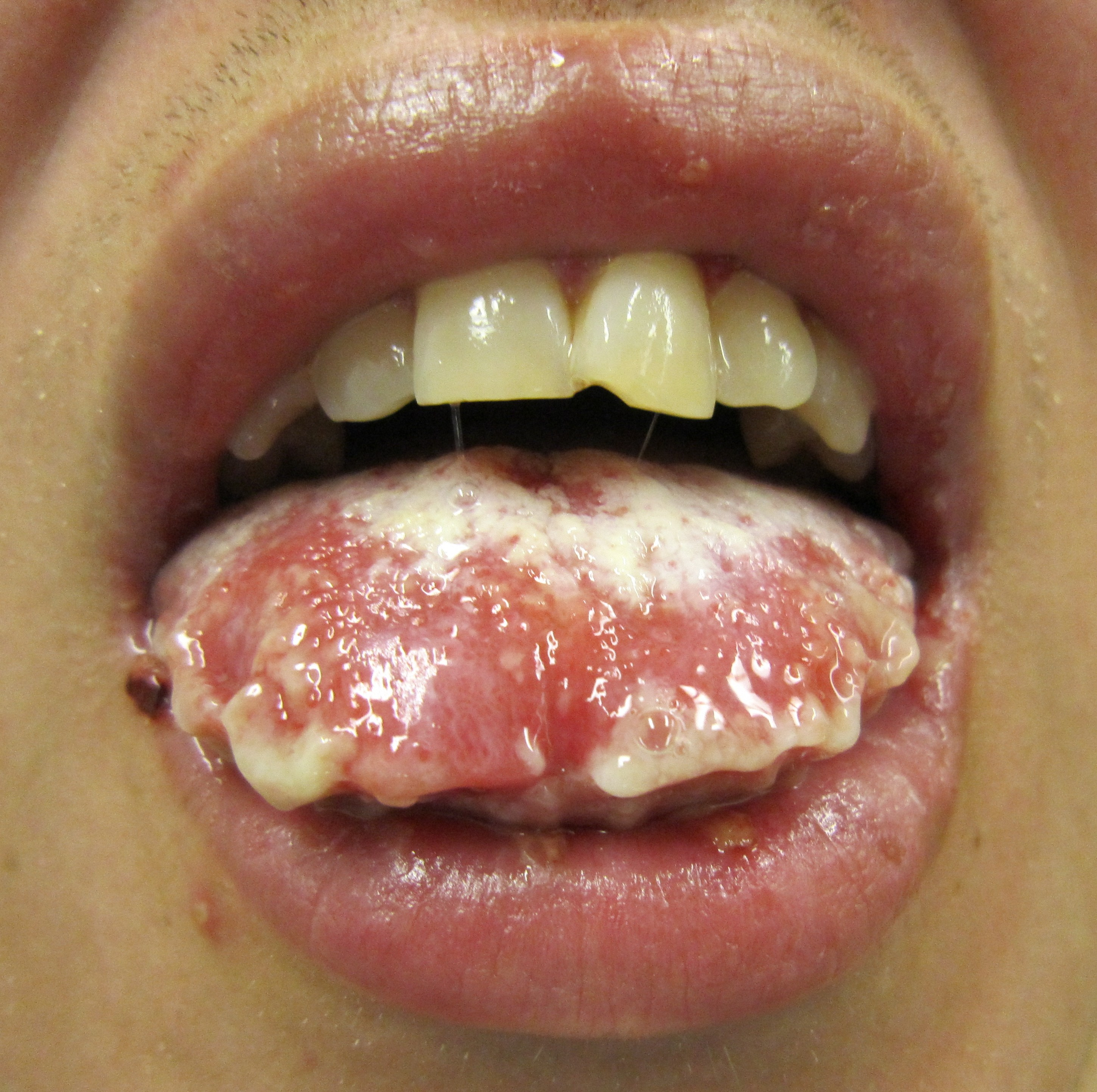
Mucosal desquamation in a person with Stevens–Johnson syndrome

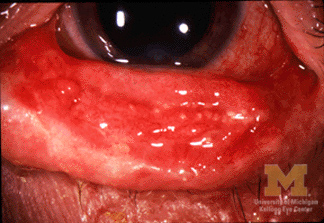
Conjunctivitis in SJS

== Causes ==
SJS is thought to arise from a disorder of the immune system. The immune reaction can be triggered by drugs or infections. Genetic factors are associated with a predisposition to SJS such as individuals expressing the human leukocyte antigen (i.e. HLA) serotypes HLA-B15:02 or HLA-A31:01 The cause of SJS is unknown in one-quarter to one-half of cases. SJS, SJS/TEN, and TEN are considered a single disease with common causes and mechanisms.

Individuals with variations in their efficiency to absorb, distribute to tissues, metabolize, or excrete a drug are predisposed to develop SJS.

=== Medications ===
Although SJS can be caused by viral infections and malignancies, the main cause is medications. A leading cause appears to be the use of antibiotics, particularly sulfa drugs. Between 100 and 200 different drugs may be associated with SJS. No reliable test exists to establish a link between a particular drug and SJS for an individual case. Determining what drug is the cause is based on the time interval between first use of the drug and the beginning of the skin reaction. Drugs discontinued more than 1 month prior to onset of mucocutaneous physical findings are highly unlikely to cause SJS and TEN. SJS and TEN most often begin between 4 and 28 days after culprit drug administration. A published algorithm (ALDEN) to assess drug causality gives structured assistance in identifying the responsible medication.

SJS may be caused by the medications rivaroxaban, vancomycin, allopurinol, valproate, levofloxacin, diclofenac, etravirine, isotretinoin, fluconazole, valdecoxib, sitagliptin, oseltamivir, penicillins, barbiturates, sulfonamides, phenytoin, azithromycin, oxcarbazepine, zonisamide, modafinil, lamotrigine, nevirapine, pyrimethamine, ibuprofen, ethosuximide, carbamazepine, bupropion, telaprevir, furosemide, and nystatin. Genetic susceptibility plays a significant role in drug-induced Stevens–Johnson syndrome. Individuals who carry HLA-B15:02 or HLA-A31:01 are at substantially increased risk of carbamazepine-induced Stevens–Johnson syndrome.

Medications that have traditionally been known to lead to SJS, erythema multiforme, and toxic epidermal necrolysis include sulfonamide antibiotics, penicillin antibiotics, cefixime (antibiotic), barbiturates (sedatives), lamotrigine, phenytoin (e.g., Dilantin) (anticonvulsants), and trimethoprim. Combining lamotrigine with sodium valproate increases the risk of SJS.

Nonsteroidal anti-inflammatory drugs (NSAIDs) are a rare cause of SJS in adults; the risk is higher for older patients, women, and those initiating treatment. Typically, the symptoms of drug-induced SJS arise within a week of starting the medication. Similar to NSAIDs, paracetamol (acetaminophen) has also caused rare cases of SJS. People with systemic lupus erythematosus or HIV infections are more susceptible to drug-induced SJS.

=== Infections ===
The second most common cause of SJS and TEN is infection, particularly in children. This includes upper respiratory infections, otitis media, pharyngitis, and Epstein–Barr virus, Mycoplasma pneumoniae and cytomegalovirus infections. The routine use of medicines such as antibiotics, antipyretics and analgesics to manage infections can make it difficult to identify if cases were caused by the infection or medicines taken.

Viral diseases reported to cause SJS include: herpes simplex virus (possibly; is debated), AIDS, coxsackievirus, influenza, hepatitis, and mumps.

In pediatric cases, Epstein–Barr virus and enteroviruses have been associated with SJS.

Recent upper respiratory tract infections have been reported by more than half of patients with SJS.

Bacterial infections linked to SJS include group A beta-hemolytic streptococci, diphtheria, brucellosis, lymphogranuloma venereum, mycobacteria, Mycoplasma pneumoniae, rickettsial infections, tularemia, and typhoid.

Fungal infections with coccidioidomycosis, dermatophytosis and histoplasmosis are also considered possible causes. Malaria and trichomoniasis, protozoal infections, have also been reported as causes.

== Pathophysiology ==
SJS is a type IV hypersensitivity reaction in which a drug or its metabolite stimulates cytotoxic T cells (i.e. CD8^{+} T cells) and T helper cells (i.e. CD4^{+} T cells) to initiate autoimmune reactions that attack self tissues. In particular, it is a type IV, subtype IVc, delayed hypersensitivity reaction dependent in part on the tissue-injuring actions of natural killer cells. This contrasts with the other types of SCARs disorders, i.e., the DRESS syndrome which is a Type IV, Subtype IVb, hypersensitivity drug reaction dependent in part on the tissue-injuring actions of eosinophils and acute generalized exanthematous pustulosis which is a Type IV, subtype IVd, hypersensitivity reaction dependent in part on the tissue-injuring actions of neutrophils.

Like other SCARs-inducing drugs, SJS-inducing drugs or their metabolites stimulate CD8^{+} T cells or CD4^{+} T cells to initiate autoimmune responses. Studies indicate that the mechanism by which a drug or its metabolites accomplishes this involves subverting the antigen presentation pathways of the innate immune system. The drug or metabolite covalently binds with a host protein to form a non-self, drug-related epitope. An antigen presenting cell (APC) takes up these alter proteins; digests them into small peptides; places the peptides in a groove on the human leukocyte antigen (i.e. HLA) component of their major histocompatibility complex (i.e. MHC); and presents the MHC-associated peptides to T-cell receptors on CD8^{+} T cells or CD4^{+} T cells. Those peptides expressing a drug-related, non-self epitope on one of their various HLA protein forms (HLA-A, HLA-B, HLA-C, HLA-DM, HLA-DO, HLA-DP, HLA-DQ, or HLA-DR) can bind to a T-cell receptor and thereby stimulate the receptor-bearing parent T cell to initiate attacks on self tissues. Alternatively, a drug or its metabolite may stimulate these T cells by inserting into the groove on a HLA protein to serve as a non-self epitope or bind outside of this groove to alter a HLA protein so that it forms a non-self epitope. In all these cases, however, a non-self epitope must bind to a specific HLA serotype (i.e. variation) in order to stimulate T cells. Since the human population expresses some 13,000 different HLA serotypes while an individual expresses only a fraction of them and since a SJS-inducing drug or metabolite interacts with only one or a few HLA serotypes, a drug's ability to induce SCARs is limited to those individuals who express HLA serotypes targeted by the drug or its metabolite. Accordingly, only rare individuals are predisposed to develop a SCARs in response to a particular drug on the bases of their expression of HLA serotypes: Studies have identified several HLA serotypes associated with development of SJS, SJS/TEN, or TEN in response to certain drugs. In general, these associations are restricted to the cited populations.

In some East Asian populations studied (Han Chinese and Thai), carbamazepine- and phenytoin-induced SJS is strongly associated with HLA-B*1502 (HLA-B75), an HLA-B serotype of the broader serotype HLA-B15. A study in Europe suggested the gene marker is only relevant for East Asians. This has clinical relevance as it is agreed upon that prior to starting a medication such as allopurinol in a patient of Chinese descent, HLA-B*58:01 testing should be considered.

Based on the Asian findings, similar studies in Europe showed 61% of allopurinol-induced SJS/TEN patients carried the HLA-B58 (phenotype frequency of the B*5801 allele in Europeans is typically 3%). One study concluded: "Even when HLA-B alleles behave as strong risk factors, as for allopurinol, they are neither sufficient nor necessary to explain the disease."

Other HLA associations with the development of SJS, SJS/TEN, or TEN and the intake of specific drugs as determined in certain populations are given in HLA associations with SCARs.

=== T-cell receptors ===
In addition to acting through HLA proteins to bind with a T-cell receptor, a drug or its metabolite may bypass HLA proteins to bind directly to a T-cell receptor and thereby stimulate CD8^{+} T or CD4^{+} T cells to initiate autoimmune responses. In either case, this binding appears to develop only on certain T cell receptors. Since the genes for these receptors are highly edited, i.e. altered to encode proteins with different amino acid sequences, and since the human population may express more than 100 trillion different (i.e. different amino acid sequences) T-cell receptors while an individual express only a fraction of these, a drug's or its metabolite's ability to induce the DRESS syndrome by interacting with a T cell receptor is limited to those individuals whose T cells express a T cell receptor(s) that can interact with the drug or its metabolite. Thus, only rare individuals are predisposed to develop SJS in response to a particular drug on the bases of their expression of specific T-cell receptor types. While the evidence supporting this T-cell receptor selectivity is limited, one study identified the preferential presence of the TCR-V-b and complementarity-determining region 3 in T-cell receptors found on the T cells in the blisters of patients with allopurinol-induced DRESS syndrome. This finding is compatible with the notion that specific types of T cell receptors are involved in the development of specific drug-induced SCARs.

=== Pharmacokinetics ===
Variations in ADME, i.e. an individual's efficiency in absorbing, tissue-distributing, metabolizing, or excreting a drug, have been found to occur in various severe cutaneous adverse reactions (SCARS) as well as other types of adverse drug reactions. These variations influence the levels and duration of a drug or its metabolite in tissues and thereby impact the drug's or metabolite's ability to evoke these reactions. For example, CYP2C9 is an important drug-metabolizing cytochrome P450; it metabolizes and thereby inactivates phenytoin. Taiwanese, Japanese, and Malaysian individuals expressing the CYP2C9*3 variant of CYP2C9, which has reduced metabolic activity compared to the wild type (i.e. CYP2c9*1) cytochrome, have increased blood levels of phenytoin and a high incidence of SJS (as well as SJS/TEN and TEN) when taking the drug. In addition to abnormalities in drug-metabolizing enzymes, dysfunctions of the kidney, liver, or GI tract which increase a SCARs-inducing drug or metabolite levels are suggested to promote SCARs responses. These ADME abnormalities, it is also suggested, may interact with particular HLA proteins and T cell receptors to promote a SCARs disorder.

== Diagnosis ==
The diagnosis is based on involvement of less than 10% of the skin. It is known as TEN when more than 30% of the skin is involved and an intermediate form with 10 to 30% involvement. A positive Nikolsky's sign is helpful in the diagnosis of SJS and TEN. A skin biopsy is helpful, but not required, to establish a diagnosis of SJS and TEN.

=== Pathology ===
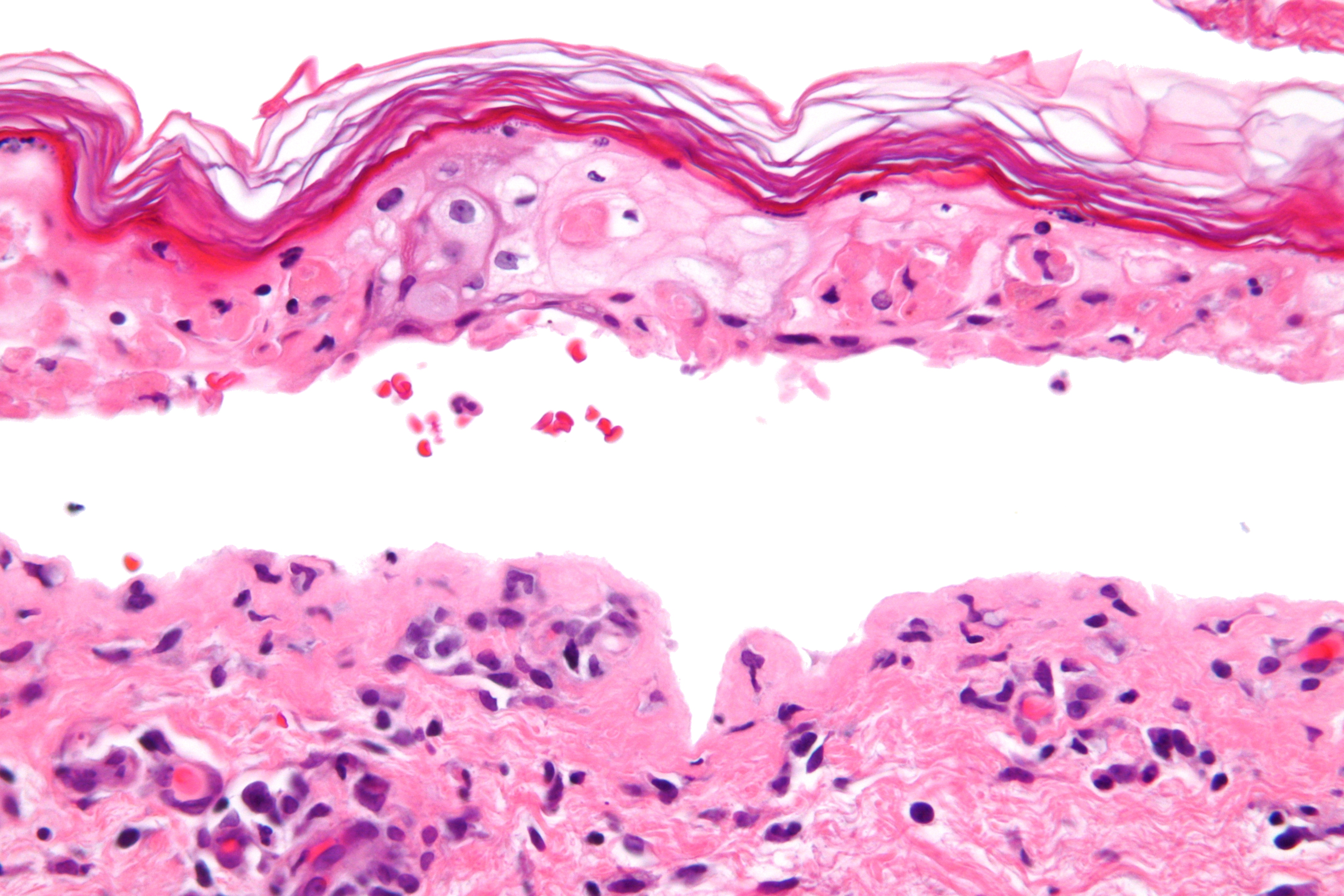
Micrograph showing full-thickness epidermal necrosis with a basket weave-like stratum corneum and separation of the dermis and epidermis, skin biopsy, H&E stain

SJS, like TEN and erythema multiforme, is characterized by confluent epidermal necrosis with minimal associated inflammation. The acuity is apparent from the (normal) basket weave-like pattern of the stratum corneum.

=== Classification ===
Stevens–Johnson syndrome (SJS) is a milder form of toxic epidermal necrolysis (TEN). These conditions were first recognized in 1922. A classification first published in 1993, that has been adopted as a consensus definition, identifies Stevens–Johnson syndrome, toxic epidermal necrolysis, and SJS/TEN overlap. All three are part of a spectrum of severe cutaneous reactions (SCAR) which affect skin and mucous membranes. The distinction between SJS, SJS/TEN overlap, and TEN is based on the type of lesions and the amount of the body surface area with blisters and erosions. It is agreed that the most reliable method to classify EM, SJS, and TEN is based on lesion morphology and extent of epidermal detachment. Blisters and erosions cover between 3% and 10% of the body in SJS, 11–30% in SJS/TEN overlap, and over 30% in TEN. The skin pattern most commonly associated with SJS is widespread, often joined or touching (confluent), papuric spots (macules) or flat small blisters or large blisters which may also join. These occur primarily on the torso.

SJS, TEN, and SJS/TEN overlap can be mistaken for erythema multiforme. Erythema multiforme, which is also within the SCAR spectrum, differs in clinical pattern and etiology.

== Prevention ==
Screening individuals for certain predisposing gene variants before initiating treatment with particular SJS-, TEN/SJS-, or TEN-inducing drugs is recommended or under study. These recommendations are typically limited to specific populations that show a significant chance of having the indicated gene variant since screening of populations with extremely low incidences of expressing the variant is considered cost-ineffective. Individuals expressing the HLA allele associated with sensitivity to an indicated drug should not be treated with the drug. These recommendations include the following. Before treatment with carbamazepine, the Taiwan and USA Food and Drug Administrations recommend screening for HLA-B*15:02 in certain Asian groups. This has been implemented in Taiwan, Hong Kong, Singapore, and many medical centers in Thailand and mainland China. Before treatment with allopurinol, the American College of Rheumatology guidelines for managing gout recommend HLA-B*58:01 screening. This is provided in many medical centers in Taiwan, Hong Kong, Thailand, and mainland China. Before treatment with abacavir, the USA Food and Drug Administration recommends screening for HLA-B*57:01 in Caucasian populations. This screening is widely implemented. It has also been suggested that all individuals found to express this HLA serotype avoid treatment with abacovir. Current trials are underway in Taiwan to define the cost-effectiveness of avoiding phenytoin in SJS, SJS/TEN, and TEN for individuals expressing the CYP2C9*3 allele of CYP2C9.

== Treatment ==
SJS constitutes a dermatological emergency. Patients with documented Mycoplasma infections can be treated with oral macrolide or oral doxycycline.

Initially, treatment is similar to that for patients with thermal burns, and continued care can only be supportive (e.g., intravenous fluids and nasogastric or parenteral feeding) and symptomatic (e.g., analgesic mouth rinse for mouth ulcer). Dermatologists and surgeons tend to disagree about whether the skin should be debrided.

Beyond this kind of supportive care, no treatment for SJS is accepted. Treatment with corticosteroids is controversial. Early retrospective studies suggested corticosteroids increased hospital stays and complication rates. No randomized trials of corticosteroids have been conducted for SJS, and it can be managed successfully without them.

Other agents have been used, including cyclophosphamide and ciclosporin, but none have exhibited much therapeutic success. Intravenous immunoglobulin treatment has shown some promise in reducing the length of the reaction and improving symptoms. Other common supportive measures include the use of topical pain anesthetics and antiseptics, maintaining a warm environment, and intravenous analgesics.

An ophthalmologist should be consulted immediately, as SJS frequently causes the formation of scar tissue inside the eyelids, leading to corneal vascularization, impaired vision, and a host of other ocular problems. Those with chronic ocular surface disease caused by SJS may find some improvement with PROSE treatment (prosthetic replacement of the ocular surface ecosystem treatment).

== Prognosis ==
SJS (with less than 10% of body surface area involved) has a mortality rate of around 5%. The mortality for toxic epidermal necrolysis (TEN) is 30–40%. The risk for death can be estimated using the SCORTEN scale, which takes a number of prognostic indicators into account. It is helpful to calculate a SCORTEN within the first 3 days of hospitalization. Other outcomes include organ damage/failure, ocular morbidity, and blindness. Restrictive lung disease may develop in patients with SJS and TEN after initial acute pulmonary involvement. Patients with SJS or TEN caused by a drug have a better prognosis the earlier the causative drug is withdrawn.

== Epidemiology ==
SJS is a rare condition, with a reported incidence of around 2.6 to 6.1 cases per million people per year. In the United States, about 300 new diagnoses are made each year. The condition is more common in adults than in children.

== History ==
SJS is named for Albert Mason Stevens and Frank Chambliss Johnson, American pediatricians who jointly published a description of the disorder in the American Journal of Diseases of Children in 1922.

== Notable cases ==
- Ab-Soul, American hip-hop recording artist and member of Black Hippy
- Padma Lakshmi, actress, model, television personality, and cookbook writer
- Manute Bol, former NBA player. Bol died from complications of Stevens–Johnson syndrome as well as kidney failure.
- Gene Sauers, three-time PGA Tour winner
- Samantha Reckis, a seven-year-old Plymouth, Massachusetts girl who lost the skin covering 95% of her body after taking children's Motrin in 2003. She survived, and in 2013, a jury awarded her $63M in a lawsuit against Johnson & Johnson, one of the largest lawsuits of its kind. The decision was upheld in 2015.
- Karen Elaine Morton, a model and actress who appeared in Tommy Tutone's "867-5309/Jenny" video and was Playmate of the Month in the July 1978 issue of Playboy Magazine.

== Research ==
In 2015, the NIH and the Food and Drug Administration (FDA) organized a workshop entitled "Research Directions in Genetically-Mediated Stevens–Johnson Syndrome/Toxic Epidermal Necrolysis".
