= Morbilliform =

Skin rash resembling measles

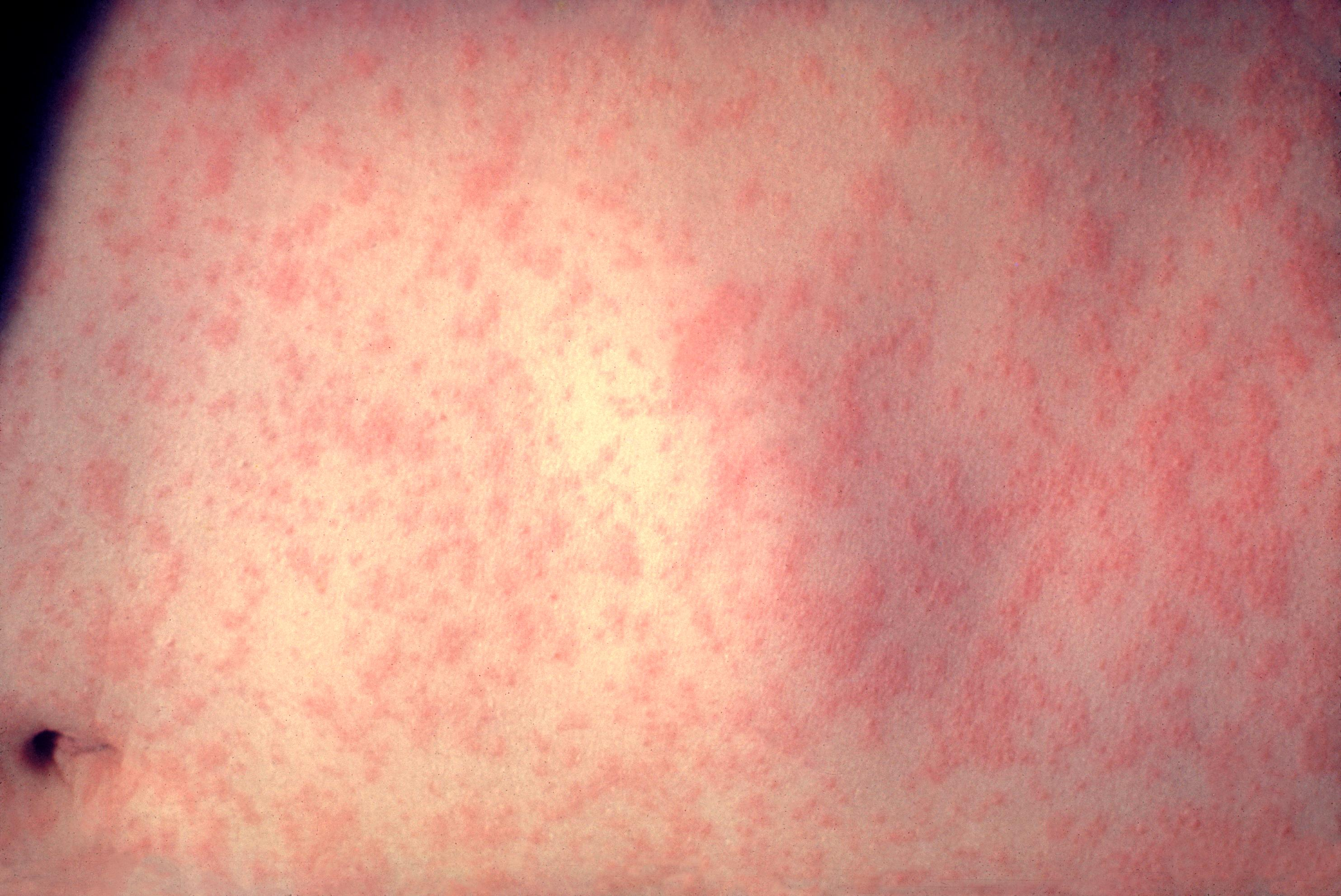
- Specialty: Dermatology

The term morbilliform refers to a rash that looks like measles. The rash consists of macular lesions that are red and usually 2–10 mm in diameter but may be confluent in places. A morbilliform rash is a rose-red flat (macular) or slightly elevated (maculopapular) eruption, showing circular or elliptical lesions varying in diameter from 1 to 3 mm, with healthy-looking skin intervening.

Patients with measles will have the rash but there are other syndromes and infections that will display the same symptom such as patients with Kawasaki disease, meningococcal petechiae or Waterhouse-Friderichsen syndrome, Dengue, Roseola, congenital syphilis, rubella, Echovirus 9, drug hypersensitivity reactions (in particular with certain classes of antiretroviral drugs, such as abacavir and nevirapine, and also the antiepileptic drug phenytoin), or other conditions may also have a morbilliform rash. It is usually present in drug reaction with eosinophilia and systemic symptoms (DRESS syndrome) following a prodrome of fever, malaise, throat pain with dysphagia, and itching. It has also been mentioned as a possible manifestation of onset or recovery from COVID-19.

One cause of morbilliform rash is an allergic reaction to transfused blood/blood components. In such a case, the skin lesions would develop within a few hours (Approx. 4hours) of transfusion along with pruritus. The condition may even present with other symptoms, such as conjunctival oedema, oedema in the lips and tongue, and even localised angioedema. On rare occasions, the condition may even escalate to anaphylactic shock where pulmonary restrictions are seen. The associated cause for this is a reaction against an allergen that is seldom identified during testing. Transfusing products with anti-IgA antibodies to IgA-deficient patients has also been a suspected cause for such reactions. Management usually relates to the stoppage of transfusion for around 30minutes, until given antihistamines take effect. Transfusion may even be continued after, if no further progression is seen.
