= HLA-Cw4 =

Human leukocyte antigen serotype

- (MHC Class I, C cell surface antigen)
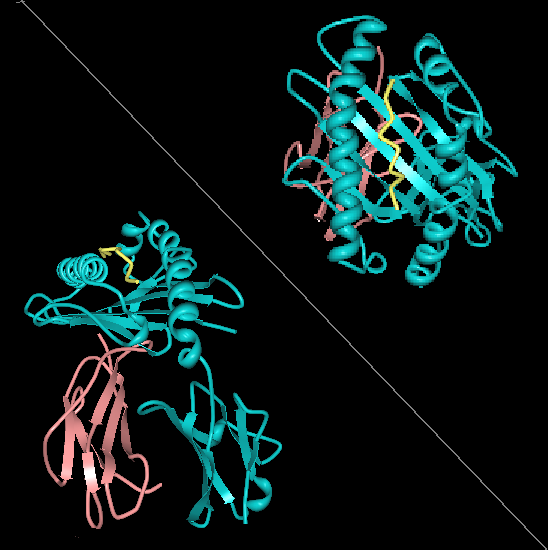
- HLA-Cw4

About
- Protein: transmembrane receptor/ligand
- Structure: αβ heterodimer
- Subunits: HLA-Cw*04--, β_{2}-microglobulin
- Older names: -

Subtypes
Subtype	allele	Available structures
Cw4	*0401	
{{{cNick2}}}	*04{{{cAllele2}}}	
{{{cNick3}}}	*04{{{cAllele3}}}	
{{{cNick4}}}	*04{{{cAllele4}}}	

Rare alleles
Subtype	allele	Available structures
Cw403	*0403	
{{{rnick2}}}	*04{{{rallele2}}}	
{{{rnick3}}}	*04{{{rallele3}}}	
- Alleles link-out to IMGT/HLA database at EBI

HLA-Cw4 (Cw4) is a human leukocyte antigen serotype within HLA-C serotype group. (For more general information on HLA serotypes, please see the article: History and naming of human leukocyte antigens.) Cw4 is determined by the antibody recognition of α^{4} subset of HLA-Cw α-chains. For the serotype Cw4, the alpha chain are encoded by the HLA-Cw*04 allele group and the β-chain are encoded by B2M locus. Cw4 and Cw*04 are almost synonymous in meaning. Cw4 is more common in Southeast Europe, where it is part of the Cw4-B35 haplotype.

== Serotype ==
Cw4 recognition of some HLA Cw*04 gene products
Cw*04	Cw4	Cw403	Cw6	Sample
allele	%	%	%	size (N)
*0401	98	0	0	736
*0403	37	5	17	25

== Alleles ==
HLA Cw*0401 frequencies
- Study population: Freq. (in %)
- Mexico Mixe Oaxaca: 37.8
- Mexico Mixtec Oaxaca: 37.3
- USA N. Mexico Canoncito N…: 31.7
- Mexico Zaptotec Oaxaca: 30.6
- Iran Baloch: 28.6
- Australia Indig. Cape Yor…: 27.5
- Australia Indig.Yuendumu: 26.8
- Australia Indig. Groote E…: 25.3
- Lebanon: 24.3
- Israel Arab Druse: 22.5
- Georgia Tbilisi Kurds: 22.4
- Brazil Terena: 22.3
- Georgia Tbilisi Georgian…: 22.0
- India Tamil Nadu Nadar: 21.3
- Mali Bandiagara: 21.3
- Taiwan Ami: 20.9
- Papua New Guinea Wanigela: 20.8
- USA African Americans pop…: 19.6
- Senegal Niokholo Mandenka: 19.5
- Cameroon Beti: 18.7
- Indig. Australian Kimberl…: 17.9
- Papua New Guinea Wosera: 17.0
- Italy North pop 1: 16.7
- New Caledonia: 16.7
- Morocco Nador Metalsa (be…: 15.9
- Portugal Centre pop 2: 15.8
- Cameroon Sawa: 15.4
- India Mumbai Marathas: 15.4
- Iran Tehran: 15.4
- USA Hispanic: 15.0
- PNG West Schrader Ranges: 14.8
- Zimbabwe Harare Shona: 14.8
- Swiss Geneva: 14.5
- Zambia Lusaka: 14.4
- Uganda Kampala: 14.1
- Brazil: 13.7
- Sudanese: 13.5
- France West: 13.4
- Tibetan: 13.3
- Finland: 13.3
- Kenya Luo: 13.2
- Cameroon Bamileke: 13.0
- Philippines Ivatan: 13.0
- Kenya: 12.9
- Singapore Riau Malay: 12.2
- India North Delhi: 11.7
- Tunisia: 11.6
- Kenya Nandi: 11.5
- Russia Tuva pop 2: 11.5
- Taiwan Bunun: 11.4
- USA Caucasian pop2: 11.1
- India West Coast Parsis: 11.0
- China Qinghai Hui: 10.9
- Czech Republic: 10.8
- India New Delhi: 10.7
- Spain Eastern Andalusia: 10.4
- UK Caucasians: 10.1
- Cameroon Pygmy Baka: 10.0
- China Beijing: 10.0
- Jordan Amman: 10.0
- Singapore Javanese: 10.0
- Papua New Guinea Madang: 9.5
- Saudi Arabia Guraiat and …: 9.5
- Australia New South Wales: 9.4
- USA Alaska Yupik Natives: 9.3
- Bulgaria Gipsy: 9.1
- Mex. Chihuahua Tarahumara: 9.1
- German Essen: 9.0
- France South East: 8.9
- Taiwan Paiwan: 8.8
- China Inner Mongolia: 8.3
- Ireland Northern: 8.3
- Venezuela Perija Yucpa: 8.3
- South Korea (1): 8.2
- China North Han: 7.6
- USA South Dakota Lakota S…: 7.4
- Taiwan Atayal: 7.1
- India West Bhils: 7.0
- PNG Karimui Plateau: 6.9
- Taiwan Siraya: 6.9
- Taiwan Thao: 6.7
- Japan (5): 6.5
- Thailand: 6.0
- China Guangzhou: 5.6
- USA Asian: 5.6
- Ireland South: 5.4
- PNG Eastern Highlands Gor…: 4.7
- Japan Central: 4.6
- Spain Eastern Andalusia G…: 4.5
- China South Han: 4.4
- South Africa Natal Tamil: 4.2
- American Samoa: 4.0
- Taiwan Saisiat: 3.9
- Papua New Guinea New Brit…: 3.6
- Taiwan Minnan pop 1: 3.4
- USA Hawaii Okinawa: 3.3
- China Guangdong Meizhou H…: 3.0
- India Khandesh Pawra: 3.0
- Taiwan Puyuma: 3.0

HLA Cw*0403 frequencies
- Study population: Freq. (in %)
- PNG West Schrader Ranges: 45.9
- Taiwan Tao: 40.0
- PMG Eastern Highlands Gor…: 34.9
- PNG Madang: 25.0
- PNG Wanigela: 16.0
- Australia Indig. Cape Yor…: 15.7
- Australia Indig. Yuendumu: 15.1
- Australia Indig. Groote E…: 12.3
- Taiwan Puyuma: 12.0
- PNG Karimui Plateau: 11.9
- Taiwan Pazeh: 11.8
- Taiwan Thao: 11.7
- New Caledonia: 11.1
- Singapore Riau Malay: 9.8
- PNG New Britain Rabaul: 8.9
- PNG Wosera: 8.0
- Singapore Javanese: 7.0
- Taiwan Rukai: 7.0
- Taiwan Bunun: 6.4
- American Samoa: 6.0
- Thailand: 5.3
- Philippines Ivatan: 5.0
- Taiwan Siraya: 4.9
- Taiwan Tsou: 4.9
- Australia Indig. Kimberly: 3.6
- Taiwan Atayal: 3.3
- South Africa Natal Tamil: 3.1
- Taiwan Ami: 2.6
- China South Han: 2.1
- USA Asian: 2.0
- Taiwan Hakka: 1.8
- China Qinghai Hui: 1.4
- Iran Tehran: 1.3
- China Guangdong Meizhou H…: 1.0
- China Inner Mongolia: 1.0
- India West Coast Parsis: 1.0
- Taiwan Minnan pop 1: 1.0
- Taiwan Paiwan: 1.0
- India New Delhi: 0.9
- Russia Tuva: 0.9
- China Tibetan: 0.6
