= Toxic epidermal necrolysis =

Severe skin reaction

- Other names: Lyell syndrome, Lyell's syndrome
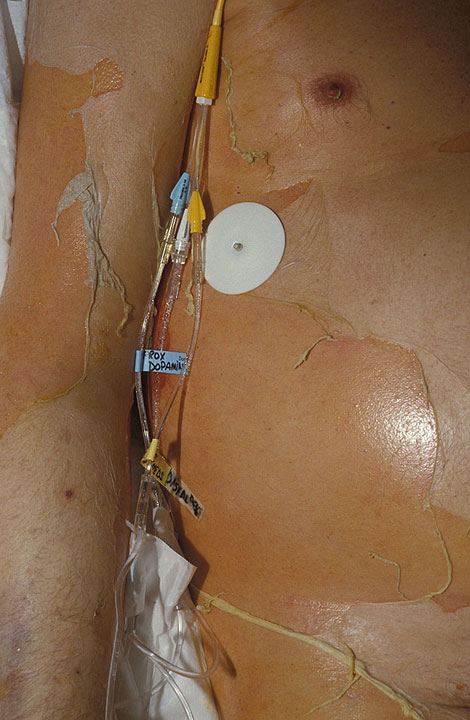
- Characteristic skin loss and peeling in toxic epidermal necrolysis
- Specialty: Dermatology
- Symptoms: Fever, skin blisters, skin peeling, painful skin, red eyes
- Complications: Dehydration, sepsis, pneumonia, multiple organ failure.
- Usual onset: Age > 40
- Risk factors: HIV/AIDS, systemic lupus erythematosus, genetics
- Diagnostic method: > 30% of the skin involved, skin biopsy
- Differential diagnosis: Chickenpox, staphylococcal epidermolysis, staphylococcal scalded skin syndrome, autoimmune bullous disease
- Treatment: Hospitalization, stopping the cause, pain medication
- Prognosis: Mortality 20–50%
- Frequency: 1–2 per million per year (together with SJS)

Toxic epidermal necrolysis (TEN), also known as Lyell's syndrome, is a type of severe skin reaction. Together with Stevens–Johnson syndrome (SJS) it forms a spectrum of disease, with TEN being more severe. Early symptoms include fever and flu-like symptoms. A few days later the skin begins to blister and peel forming painful raw areas. Mucous membranes, such as the mouth, are also typically involved. Complications include dehydration, sepsis, pneumonia, and multiple organ failure.

The most common cause is certain medications such as lamotrigine, carbamazepine, allopurinol, sulfonamide antibiotics, and nevirapine. Other causes can include infections such as Mycoplasma pneumoniae and cytomegalovirus or the cause may remain unknown. Risk factors include HIV/AIDS and systemic lupus erythematosus. Diagnosis is based on a skin biopsy and involvement of more than 30% of the skin. TEN is a type of severe cutaneous adverse reactions (SCARs), together with SJS, a SJS/TEN, and drug reaction with eosinophilia and systemic symptoms. It is called SJS when less than 10% of the skin is involved and an intermediate form with 10 to 30% involvement. Erythema multiforme (EM) is generally considered a separate condition.

Treatment typically takes place in hospital such as in a burn unit or intensive care unit. Efforts include stopping the cause, pain medication, and antihistamines. Antibiotics, intravenous immunoglobulins, and corticosteroids may also be used. Treatments do not typically change the course of the underlying disease. Together with SJS it affects 1 to 2 persons per million per year. It is more common in females than males. Typical onset is over the age of 40. Skin usually regrows over two to three weeks; however, recovery can take months and most are left with chronic problems.

== Signs and symptoms ==
=== Prodrome ===
TEN ultimately results in extensive skin involvement with redness, necrosis, and detachment of the top (epidermal) layer of the skin and mucosa. Before these severe findings develop, people often have a flu-like prodrome, with a cough, runny nose, fever, decreased appetite and malaise. A history of drug exposure exists on average 14 days (ranging from 1–4 weeks) prior to the onset of symptoms, but may result as early as 48 hours if it is a reexposure.

=== Skin findings ===
Initial skin findings include red-purple, dusky, flat spots known as macules that start on the trunk and spread out from there. These skin lesions then transform into large blisters. The affected skin can then become necrotic or sag from the body and peel off in great swaths.

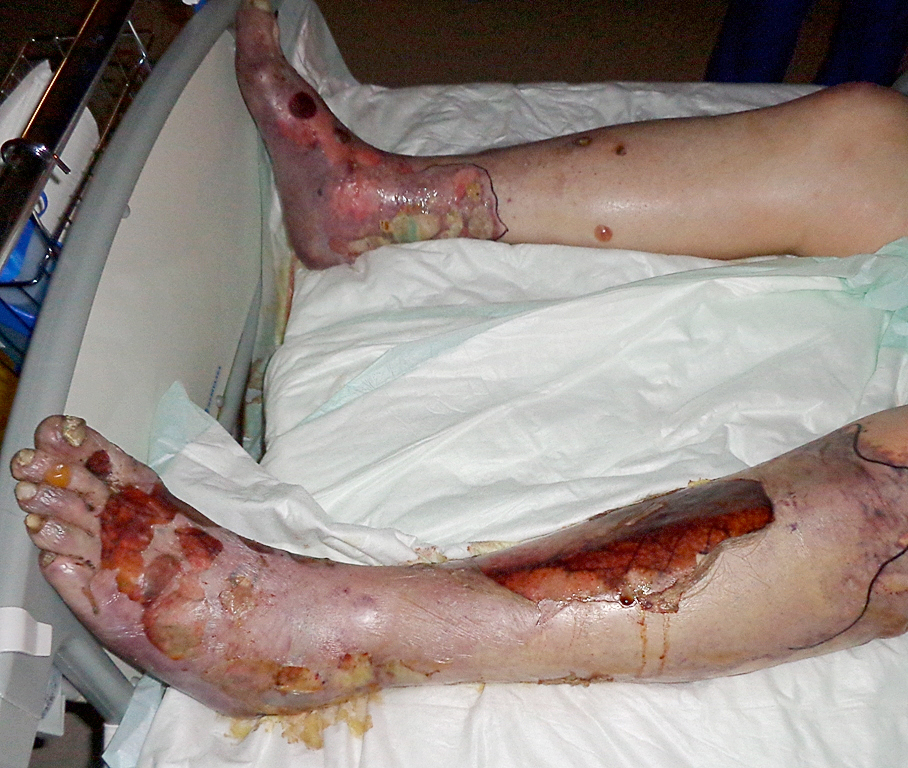
Toxic epidermal necrolysis on legs

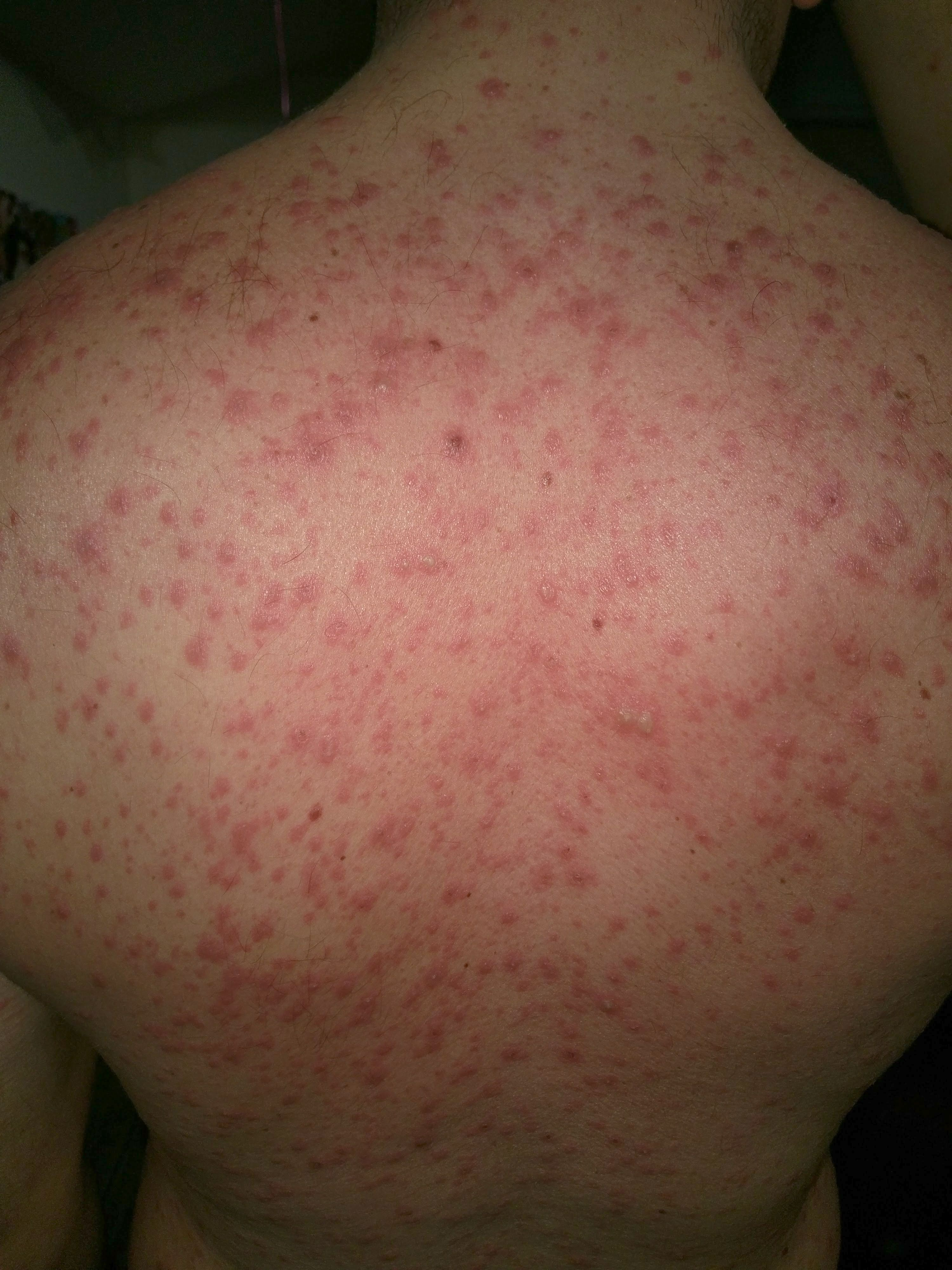
The emerging blisters on day 4 of an instance of TEN

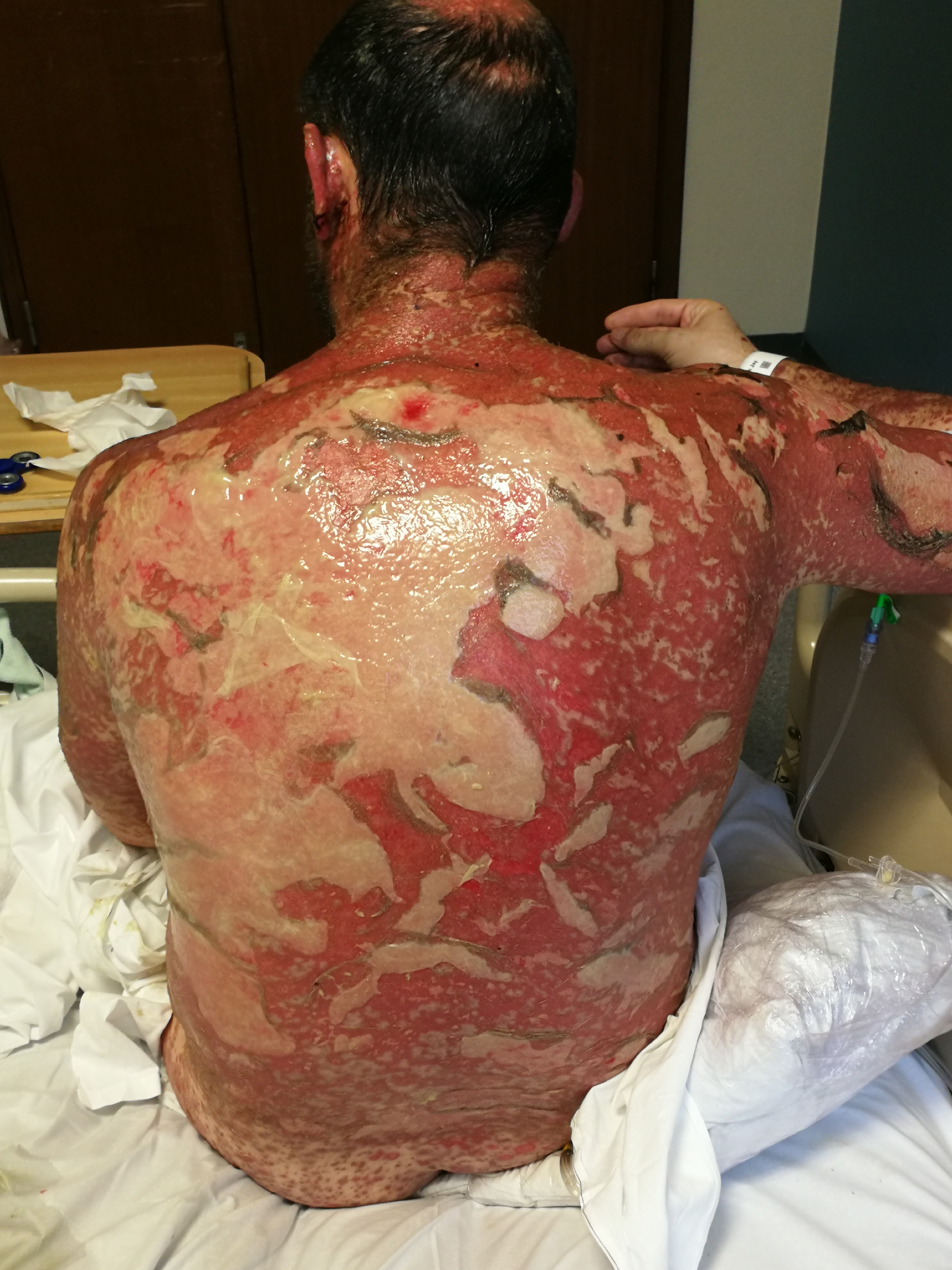
The back of a TEN patient on day 10, at the peak of the condition

=== Mucosal findings ===
Nearly all people with TEN have oral, eye and genital involvement as well. Painful crusts and erosions may develop on any mucosal surface. The mouth becomes blistered and eroded, making eating difficult and sometimes necessitating feeding through a nasogastric tube through the nose or a gastric tube directly into the stomach. The eyes can become swollen, crusted, and ulcerated, leading to potential blindness. The most common problem with the eyes is severe conjunctivitis.

=== Complications ===
Those who survive the acute phase of TEN often develop long-term complications affecting the skin and eyes. Skin manifestations can include scarring, eruptive melanocytic nevi, vulvovaginal stenosis, and dyspareunia. The epithelium of the trachea, bronchi, or gastrointestinal tract may be involved in SJS and TEN. Ocular symptoms are the most common complication in TEN, experienced by 20–79% of those with TEN, even by those who do not experience immediate ocular manifestations. These can include dry eyes, photophobia, symblepharon, corneal scarring or xerosis, subconjunctival fibrosis, trichiasis, decreased visual acuity, and blindness.

== Cause ==
Drug reactions have been reported to cause 80–95% of TEN cases.

The drugs most often implicated in TEN are:

- antibiotics
  - sulfonamides (sulfamethoxazole, sulfadiazine, sulfapyridine)
  - beta-lactams (cephalosporins, penicillins, carbapenems)
- nonsteroidal anti-inflammatory drugs
- allopurinol
- antimetabolites (methotrexate)
- antiretroviral drugs (nevirapine)
- corticosteroids
- anxiolytics (chlormezanone)
- anticonvulsants (phenobarbital, phenytoin, carbamazepine, lamotrigine, and valproic acid).

TEN has also been reported to result from infection with Mycoplasma pneumoniae or dengue virus. Contrast agents used in imaging studies as well as transplantation of bone marrow or organs have also been linked to TEN development.

=== HIV ===
HIV-positive individuals have 1000 times the risk of developing SJS/TEN compared to the general population. The reason for this increased risk is not clear.

=== Genetics ===
Certain genetic factors are associated with increased risk of TEN. For example, certain HLA-types such as, HLA-B*1502, HLA-A*3101, HLA-B*5801, and HLA‐B*57:01 have been seen to be linked with TEN development when exposed to specific drugs.

== Pathogenesis ==
The immune system's role in the precise pathogenesis of TEN remains unclear. It appears that a certain type of immune cell (cytotoxic CD8+ T cell) is primarily responsible for keratinocyte death and subsequent skin detachment. Keratinocytes are the cells found lower in the epidermis and specialize in holding the surrounding skin cells together. It is theorized that CD8+ immune cells become overactive by stimulation from drugs or drug metabolites. CD8+ T cells then mediate keratinocyte cell death through release of a number of molecules, including perforin, granzyme B, and granulysin. Other agents, including tumor necrosis factor alpha and Fas ligand, also appear to be involved in TEN pathogenesis.

== Diagnosis ==
The diagnosis of TEN is based on both clinical and histologic findings. Early TEN can resemble non-specific drug reactions, so clinicians should maintain a high index of suspicion for TEN. The presence of oral, ocular, and/or genital mucositis is helpful diagnostically, as these findings are present in nearly all patients with TEN. The Nikolsky sign (a separation of the papillary dermis from the basal layer upon gentle lateral pressure) and the Asboe-Hansen sign (a lateral extension of bullae with pressure) are also helpful diagnostic signs found in patients with TEN.

Given the significant morbidity and mortality from TEN, as well as improvement in outcome from prompt treatment, there is significant interest in the discovery of serum biomarkers for early diagnosis of TEN. Serum granulysin and serum high-mobility group protein B1 (HMGB1) are among a few of the markers being investigated which have shown promise in early research.

=== Histology ===
Definitive diagnosis of TEN often requires biopsy confirmation. Histologically, early TEN shows scattered necrotic keratinocytes. In more advanced TEN, full thickness epidermal necrosis is visualized, with a subepidermal split, and scant inflammatory infiltrate in the papillary dermis. Epidermal necrosis found on histology is a sensitive but nonspecific finding for TEN.

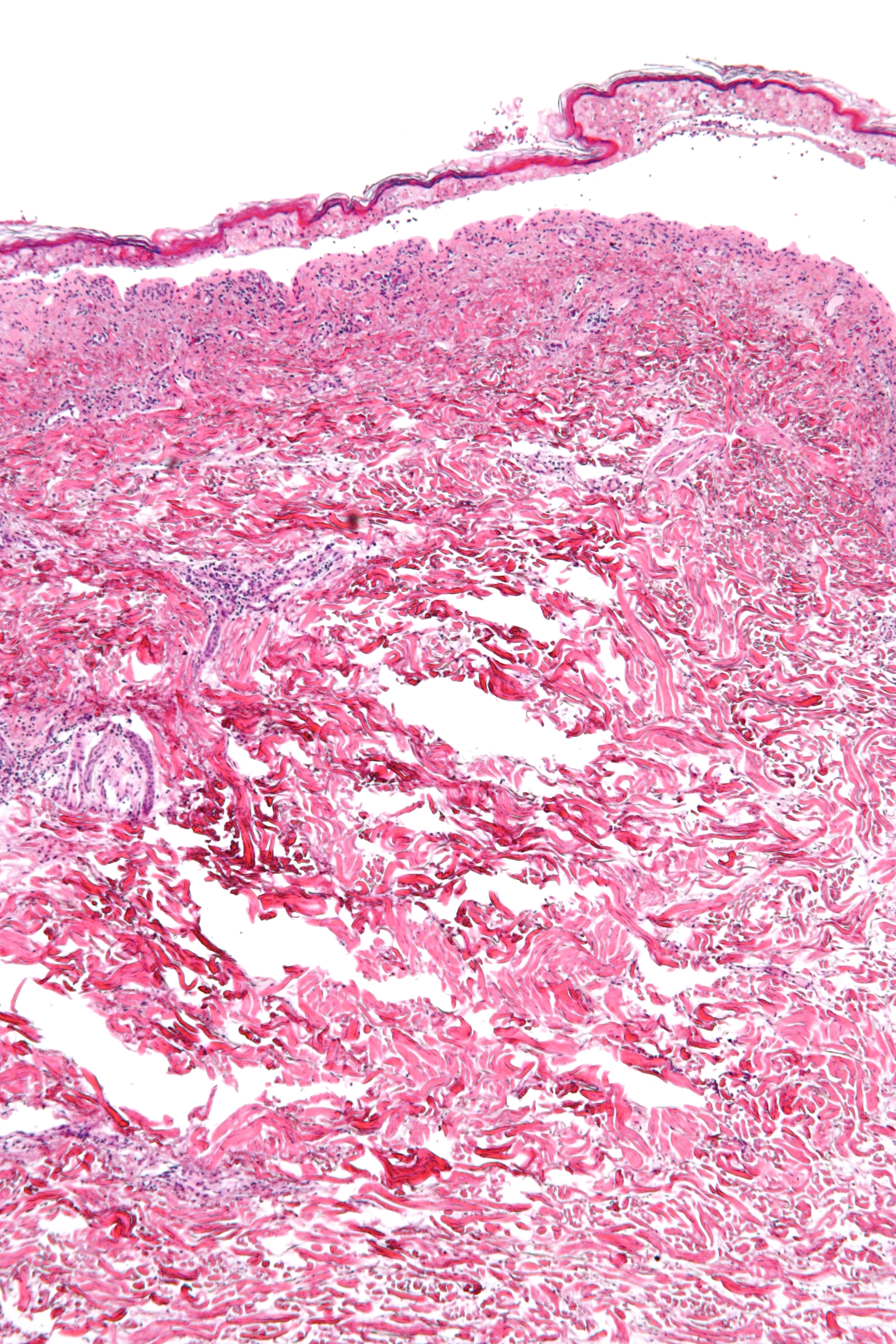
Confluent Epidermal Necrosis, low mag

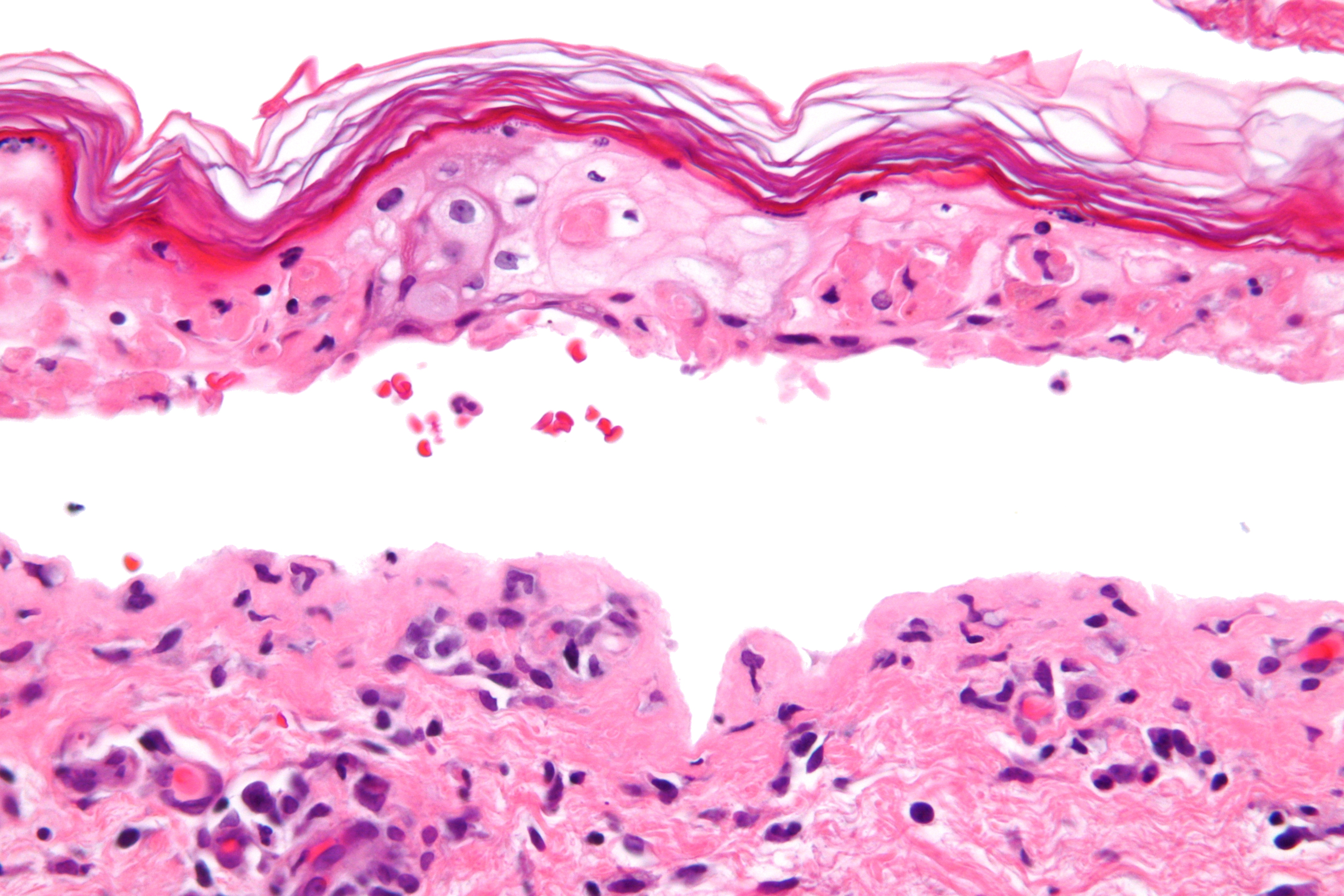
Confluent Epidermal Necrosis, high mag

=== Differential diagnosis ===
- Staphylococcal scalded skin syndrome
- Drug-induced linear immunoglobulin A dermatosis
- Acute graft versus host disease
- Acute generalized exanthematous pustulosis
- Erythroderma
- Drug reaction with eosinophilia and systemic symptoms aka DRESS
- A generalized morbilliform eruption

== Treatment ==
The primary treatment of TEN is discontinuation of the causative factor(s), usually an offending drug, early referral and management in burn units or intensive care units, supportive management, and nutritional support.

Current literature does not convincingly support use of any adjuvant systemic therapy. Initial interest in Intravenous immunoglobulin (IVIG) came from research showing that IVIG could inhibit Fas-FasL mediated keratinocyte apoptosis in vitro. Unfortunately, research studies reveal conflicting support for use of IVIG in treatment of TEN. Ability to draw more generalized conclusions from research to date has been limited by lack of controlled trials, and inconsistency in study design in terms of disease severity, IVIG dose, and timing of IVIG administration. Larger, high quality trials are needed to assess the actual benefit of IVIG in TEN.

Numerous other adjuvant therapies have been tried in TEN including, corticosteroids, ciclosporin, cyclophosphamide, plasmapheresis, pentoxifylline, acetylcysteine, ulinastatin, infliximab, and granulocyte colony-stimulating factors (if TEN associated-leukopenia exists). There is mixed evidence for use of corticosteroids and scant evidence for the other therapies. A meta-analysis from 2002 concluded that there is no reliable evidence for the treatment of TEN. Thalidomide did not show any benefit and was associated with increased mortality compared with placebo.

== Prognosis ==
The mortality for toxic epidermal necrolysis is 25–30%. People with SJS or TEN caused by a medication have a better prognosis the earlier the causative medication is withdrawn. Loss of the skin leaves patients vulnerable to infections from fungi and bacteria, and can result in sepsis, the leading cause of death in the disease. Death is caused either by infection or by respiratory distress which is either due to pneumonia or damage to the linings of the airway. Microscopic analysis of tissue (especially the degree of dermal mononuclear inflammation and the degree of inflammation in general) can play a role in determining the prognosis of individual cases.

=== Severity score ===
The "Severity of Illness Score for Toxic Epidermal Necrolysis" (SCORTEN) is a scoring system developed to assess the severity of TEN and predict mortality in patients with acute TEN.

One point is given for each of the following factors:

- age >40
- heart rate >120 beats/minute
- carrying diagnosis of cancer
- separation of epidermis on more than ten percent of body surface area (BSA) on day 1.
- Blood Urea Nitrogen >28 mg/dL
- Glucose >252 mg/dL (14 mmol/L)
- Bicarbonate <20mEq/L

==== Score ====
- 0–1: 3.2% mortality
- 2: 12.2% mortality
- 3: 35.3% mortality
- 4: 58.3% mortality
- ≥5: 90% mortality

Of note, this scoring system is most valuable when used on the first and third day of hospitalization, and it may underestimate mortality in patients with respiratory symptoms.
