= HLA-B*83 =

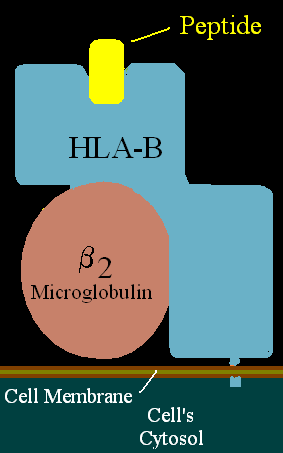
major histocompatibility complex (human), class I, B*83
Alleles	B*8301
Structure (See HLA-B)
Symbol(s)	HLA-B
EBI-HLA	B*8301
Locus	chr.6 6p21.31

HLA-B*83 (B83) is an HLA-B allele-group composed of a single allele, B*8301. There is no useful serology associated with this allele.

It is found in a single Mbenzele Pygmy tribe of the Central Africa Republic at 1.5%. B*8301 appears to be the result of the replacement of exon 2 from B*4402 with exon 2 from B*5603. (For terminology help see: HLA-serotype tutorial)

Location of Central African Republic

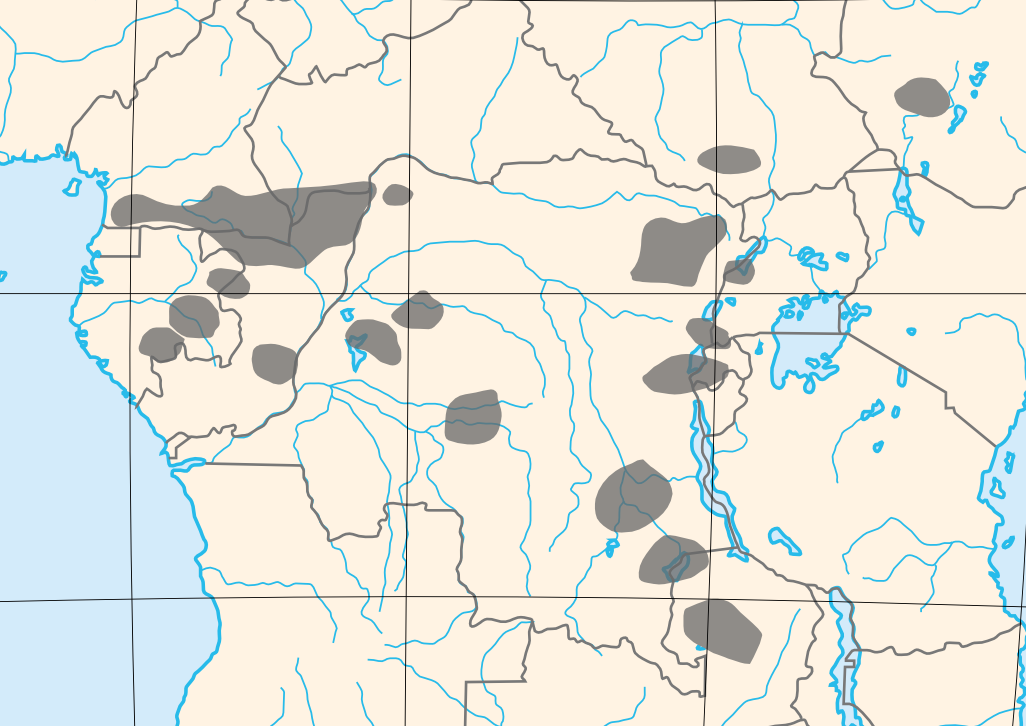
Location of Africa's Pygmy Tribes
