= B52 (disambiguation) =

The B-52 is an American strategic bomber aircraft.

B-52 or B52 may also refer to:

- The B-52s, an American new wave band
  - The B-52's (album)
- B52 (New York City bus), a bus line in Brooklyn, New York
- B52 (chess opening), a chess opening based on the Sicilian Defence
- B-52 (cocktail)
- B-52 (hairstyle) or beehive, a hairstyle
- B52 (medical treatment), an intramuscular injection of three medications to treat agitation
- B-52 Memorial Park, a park within the Orlando International Airport, Florida
- Volvo B52 engine, a group of Volvo engines
- Nora B-52, a Serbian self-propelled howitzer
- HLA-B52, an HLA-B serotype
- Bundesstraße 52, a federal highway in Germany
- B52, route number for Kings Highway in Australia
- B-52, a coded reference to Mao Zedong in Project 571
- B-52, a pennant number of the Argentinian fast transport ship ARA Hércules (B-52)
