= HLA-B67 =

Human leukocyte antigen serotype

major histocompatibility complex (human), class I, B67
Alleles	B*6701
Structure (See HLA-B)
Symbol(s)	HLA-B
EBI-HLA	B*6701
Locus	chr.6 6p21.31

HLA-B67 (B67) is an HLA-B serotype. The serotype identifies the more common HLA-B*67 gene products. B67 is region specific recombinant haplotype formed by the gene conversion of B*39, an allele common along the Northwest Pacific Rim (Taiwan, Japan, Korea, Coastal Siberia), and B7, B22, or B27. (For terminology help see: HLA-serotype tutorial)

== Serotype ==
B67 Serotype recognition of the B*67 allele-group gene products
B*67	B67	Other	Sample
allele	%	%	size (N)
6701	32	62	81

=== By allele ===
Regions of higher B*6701 frequency
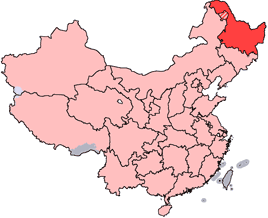
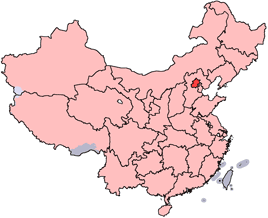
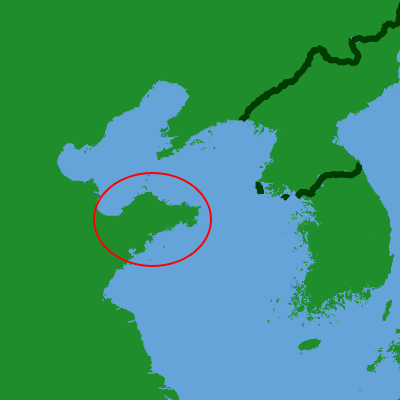
Japan
Taiwan
Heilongjiang province, China (Harbin city)
Beijing; China
Shandong peninsula

HLA B*6701 frequencies
		freq
ref.	Population	(%)
	Osaka Region (Japan)	2.6
	Hakka (Taiwan)	1.8
	Japan (5)	1.7
	Harbin Man (China)	1.7
	Beijing (China)	1.5
	Linqu (Shandong, China)	1.1
	Siraya (Taiwan)	1.0
	Portugal South	1.0
	Oold (Mongolia)	1.0
	American Samoa	1.0
	Pazeh (Taiwan)	0.9
	South Korea (3)	0.9
	N. Korean (Harbin, China)	0.8
	Arratia Basque (Spain)	0.6
	Tarialan Khoton (Mongolia)	0.6
	Shanghai (China)	0.6
	Natal Zulu (South African)	0.5
	Yunnan Han (China)	0.5
	Turkey	0.4
	Southern Han (China)	0.4
	Tuva (Russia)	0.3
	Chinese (Hong Kong, China)	0.1
