= HLA-B81 =

Human leukocyte antigen serotype

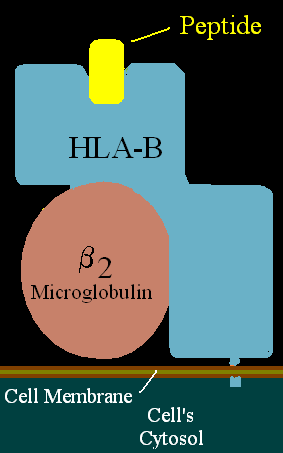
major histocompatibility complex (human), class I, B81
Alleles	B*8101
Structure (See HLA-B)
Symbol(s)	HLA-B
Locus	chr.6 6p21.31

HLA-B81 (B81) is an HLA–B serotype. The serotype identifies the HLA-B*8101 and B*8102 (very rare) gene products. B81 is more common in Subsaharan Africa. While there is a B81 serotype, serotyping of B81 is poor when simultaneously tested with anti-B7 or B48 antibodies. (For terminology help see: HLA-serotype tutorial)

== Serotype ==
B81 serotype recognition of Some HLA B*81 allele-group gene products
B*81	B81	B7	Sample
allele	%	%	size (N)
*8101	8	76	657

The serotype recognition of B*8101 is poor and is best identified by genetic techniques such as SSP-PCR and gene sequencing.

== Allele frequencies ==
HLA B*8101 frequencies
	freq
Population	(%)
Luo (Kenya)	6.2
Yaoundé (Cameroon)	4.4
Shona (Harare, Zimbabwe)	4.0
Nandi (Kenya)	4.0
Tswana (South Africa)	3.7
Natal Zulu (South African)	3.5
Baloch (Iran)	3.5
Kenya	2.8
Pazeh (Taiwan)	2.7
Lusaka (Zambia)	2.3
Bakola Pygmy (Cameroon)	2.0
Beti (Cameroon)	1.7
Oman	1.3
Bamileke (Cameroon )	1.3
United Arab Emirates	1.1
Southern Portugal	1.0
Kampala (Uganda)	0.9
Sudanese	0.5
Delhi (India)	0.5
Brazil Parana Mulatto	0.5
Romanian	0.3
Chinese (Hong Kong, China)	0.2
Shijiazhuang Tianjian (Beijing, China)	0.2
South Korea	0.1

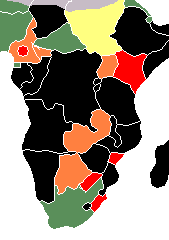
Regions of Africa with Higher B81 frequencies(Red-Orange)

HLA-B81 corresponds to a single allele B*8101. There are no characterized haplotypes of this allele that span multiple regions, though rare haplotypes certainly exist. The frequency in Kenya, Zimbabwe and Cameroon suggest that B81 probably expanded from core groups of Africans in Tanzania, Zambia or the Congo but with a limited spread due to its initial low frequency.
