= HLA-B*82 =

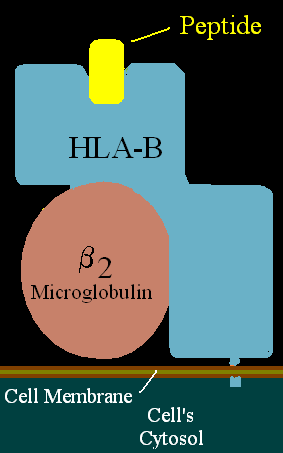
major histocompatibility complex (human), class I, B82
Alleles	B*8201
Structure (See HLA-B)
Symbol(s)	HLA-B
Locus	chr.6 6p21.31

HLA-B*82 (B*82) is an HLA-B allele-group. There is no current useful serotyping for HLA-B*82 gene products. B*8201 was first identified by sequence analysis and appears to be derived by gene conversion between B*5602 and another HLA class I allele., later B*8202 was identified in a caucasian and was suggested to be ancestral to B*8201, as product between gene conversion of B*5602 allele and B*4501 allele. B*82 is more common in East Africa, Kenya and Sudan, the frequency of B*8201 is found in the peoples to the west, sporadically in Central and West Africa, and B*8202 is found in Sudan and Saudi Arabia.

== Serotype ==
B82 serotype recognition of Some HLA B*82 allele-group gene products
B*82	B82	other	Sample
allele	%	%	size (N)
*8201	3	79	146

=== Allele frequencies ===
HLA B*8201 frequencies
		freq
ref.	Population	(%)
	Luo (Kenya)	1.9
	Guinea Bissau	0.8
	Natal Zulu (S. Africa)	0.5
	Beti (Cameroon)	0.3
	Kenya	0.3
	Kampala (Uganda)	0.3
	Nandi (Kenya)	0.2
'
HLA B**8202 frequencies
	Sudanese	2.5
	Kenya	0.7
	Guraiat and Hail (Saudi Arabia)	0.2
