= HLA-B59 =

Human leukocyte antigen serotype

major histocompatibility complex (human), class I, B59
| Alleles | B*5901 |
Structure (See HLA-B)
| Symbol(s) | HLA-B |
| EBI-HLA | B*5901 |
| Locus | chr.6 6p21.31 |

HLA-B59 (B59) is an HLA-B serotype. The serotype identifies the more common HLA-B*## gene products. B59 is a hybrid between B*55 and B*51. B59 is more common in Japan, Korea, N. China and Mongolia. (For terminology help see: HLA-serotype tutorial)

== Serotype ==
B59 serotype recognition of the HLA B*59 allele-group gene products
| B*59 | B59 | Other | Sample |
| allele | % | % | size (N) |
| 5901 | 45 | 41 | 123 |

== B*5901 allele frequencies ==
HLA B*5901 frequencies
| | | freq |
| ref. | Population | (%) |
| | Okinawan (USA Hawaii) | 6.3 |
| | Japan (2) | 2.7 |
| | Tarialan Khoton (Mongolia) | 2.4 |
| | South Korea (3) | 2.1 |
| | Gipuscoa Basque (Spain) | 2.0 |
| | Japan Central | 1.8 |
| | Casablanca (Morocco) | 1.8 |
| | Hyogo (Japan) | 1.6 |
| | N. Korean (Harbin, China) | 1.0 |
| | Manchu (Harbin, China) | 0.6 |
| | Naxi (Yunnan, China) | 0.6 |
| | Girona (Catalonia, Spain) | 0.6 |
| | Algeria (1) | 0.5 |
| | Inner Mongolia (China) | 0.5 |
| | Khalkha (Mongolia) | 0.5 |
| | Shanghai (China) | 0.3 |
| | Essen (German ) | 0.3 |
| | Southern Han (China) | 0.2 |
| | Shij. Tian. (Beijing, China) | 0.1 |
| | Hakka (Taiwan) | 0.1 |

Regions of higher B*5901 frequency
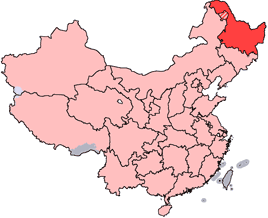
| Japan |
| Korea |
| Mongolia |
| Heilongjiang prov., China (Harbin city) |
