= HLA-B12 =

Human leukocyte antigen serotype

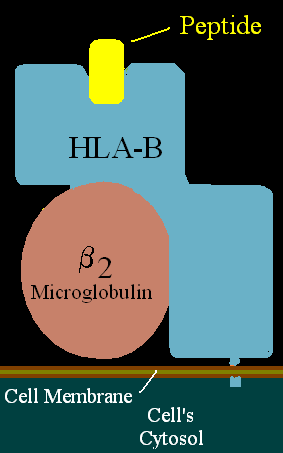
major histocompatibility complex (human), class I, B51
Split antigens	HLA-B44, HLA-B45

HLA-B12 (B12) is an HLA-B serotype. B12 is a broad antigen serotype that recognizes the B44 and B45 split antigen serotypes.
