= B37 =

B37 may refer to:

- HLA-B37, an HLA-B serotype
- Bundesstraße 37, a German road
- ATN1, a human protein alternately known as B37
- Lockheed B-37, a Lockheed Ventura aircraft
- Soviet submarine B-37, a Project 641 or Foxtrot-class diesel submarine of the Soviet Navy's Northern Fleet
- Soviet gun B-37, caliber 406 mm. (ru:406-мм морская пушка Б-37)
- BMW B37, a three-cylinder turbo diesel engine designed by BMW
