= B83 =

B83 may refer to:

- B83 nuclear bomb
- HLA-B*83, an HLA-B serotype
- B83 (New York City bus) in Brooklyn
- Sicilian Defence, Scheveningen Variation, Encyclopaedia of Chess Openings code
- B83 NSW Highway
