= 6B =

6B or 6b or VI-B may refer to:

- Keratin 6B, a type II cytokeratin
- Oflag VI-B, a World War II German POW camp for officers located 5 km (3.1 mi) SW of the small town Dössel
- REL-6B Radar, a ground air surveillance and guidance radar
- Rumpler 6B, a 1916 German single-engine floatplane fighter
- Season 6B, a popular fan theory related to the long-running British science fiction television series Doctor Who
- Stalag VI-B, a Nazi World War II camp for prisoners of war
- TUIfly Nordic IATA airline designator
- British Rail Class 203 Diesel-electric Multiple Units, which were classed as 6B (6 coaches, buffet) pre-TOPS
- "6B" (Fringe), an episode of the television series Fringe
- 6b/8b encoding, six-bit codes in telecommunications
- Supermarine S.6B, a British racing seaplane
- HAT-P-6b, a transiting extrasolar planet
- Northrop Grumman EA-6B Prowler, an American, twinjet all-weather attack aircraft
- 6B, the production code for the 1982 Doctor Who serial Earthshock

== See also ==
- B6 (disambiguation)
