= HLA-B57 =

Human leukocyte antigen serotype

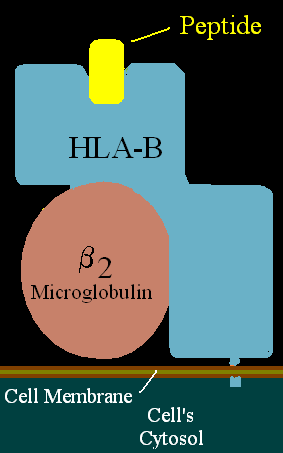
HLA-B (alpha)-β2MG with bound peptide
major histocompatibility complex (human), class I, B57
Alleles	*5701, *5702, *5703, *5704, *5708
Structure (See HLA-B)
Shared data
Locus	chr.6 6p21.31

HLA-B57 (B57) is an HLA-B serotype. B57 is a split antigen from the B17 broad antigen, the sister serotype being B58. The serotype identifies the more common HLA-B*57 gene products. (For terminology help see: HLA-serotype tutorial.) Like B58, B57 is involved in drug-induced inflammatory skin disorders.

== Disease ==
HLA-B*5701 is associated with drug-induced inflammatory disease of the skin. Individuals with B57 are more sensitive to the drug abacavir. Abacavir is an antiretroviral drug used in treatment of HIV, however in sensitive individuals fever, skin rash, fatigue, gastrointestinal symptoms such as nausea, vomiting, diarrhea or abdominal pain and respiratory symptoms such as pharyngitis, dyspnea, or cough can develop. FDA has advised that people from at-risk ethnic groups, (see alle distribution table) be screened prior to drug-therapy. [Note: phenotype frequencies are roughly double allele frequencies -tabled values- when allele frequency is less than 30%]

The mechanism by which abacavir causes this type 4 hypersensitivity reaction is by binding in the antigen-binding cleft of the HLA-B*57:01 protein, allowing new, "non-self" antigens to bind and be presented to T cells.

== Serotype ==
B57 and B17 serotype recognition of some more common HLA B*57 alleles
B*57	B57	B17	Sample
allele	%	%	size (N)
*5701	92	5	3670
*5702	78	8	65
*5703	85	6	412
*5704	67	7	32

== Allele distribution ==
HLA B*5701 frequencies
		freq
ref.	Population	(%)
	South Africa Natal Tamil	10.2
	India Tamil Nadu Nadar	8.2
	Spain E. Andalusia Gipsy	7.1
	Ireland South	5.8
	India North Delhi	4.9
	India New Delhi	3.8
	Ireland Northern	3.8
	Azores Central Islands	3.6
	Cuban White	3.6
	France South East	3.5
	China Guangzhou Han	3.3
	China North Han	3.3
	Czech Republic	3.3
	Russia Tuva (2)	3.3
	Cape Verde NW Islands	3.2
	Azores Terceira Island	3.1
	Portugal South	3.1
	Thailand (3)	3.1
	Uganda Kampala	3.1
	Portugal Centre	3.0
	Tunisia	3.0
	India Andhra Pradesh Golla	2.9
	Belgium	2.0
	China Inner Mongolia	2.0
	Croatia	2.0
	SP Javanese Indonesians	2.0
	Singapore Riau Malay	2.0
	India North Hindus	1.9
	Bulgaria	1.8
	Thailand	1.8
	Finland	1.7
	Macedonia pop 4	1.6
	Madeira	1.6
	Indig. Australian Cape York Penin.	1.5
	Israel Arab Druse	1.5
	Sudanese	1.5
	Morocco Nador Metalsa (Berber)	1.4
	Oman	1.3
	Mexico Mestizos	1.2
	Zambia Lusaka	1.1
	Shijiazhuang Tianjian Han	1.0
	Iran Baloch	1.0
	USA Asian	1.0

HLA B*5702 frequencies
		freq
ref.	Population	(%)
	Zambia Lusaka	2.3
	Senegal Niokholo Mandenka	1.6
	Kenya	1.4
	Mali Bandiagara	1.1
	South African Natal Zulu	1.0
B*5703
	Zambia Lusaka	5.7
	Cameroon Bakola Pygmy	5.0
	Ivory Coast Akan Adiopodoume	4.6
	Zimbabwe Harare Shona	4.4
	South African Natal Zulu	4.0
	Cameroon Bamileke	3.2
	Cameroon Beti	3.2
	Kenya Nandi	2.9
	Israel Ashk. & Non-Ashk. Jews	2.8
	Cameroon Yaounde	2.7
	Tunisia Tunis	2.3
	Saudi Arabia Guraiat and Hail	1.5
