= HLA-B17 =

Human leukocyte antigen serotype

HLA-B17 (B17) is an HLA - B serotype. B17 is a broad antigen serotype that recognizes the B57 and B58 split antigen serotypes. B17 is still encountered in the current literature, although most studies now use B57/B58 or gene typing designators. Both serotypes are involved in slightly different drug-sensitive diseases.
