= B14 =

B14 may refer to:

== Transportation ==
- B14 (New York City bus)
- HLA-B14, an HLA - B serotype
- London Buses route B14
- Bundesstraße 14, federal highway in Germany
- Martin XB-14, a variant of the Martin B-10 bomber
- The generation of Nissan Sentra built from 1995 to 1999
- Volvo B14A engine
- Chery V5, a Chinese car, also known as Chery B14
- B14 (dinghy), the class of sailing dinghy designed by Julian Bethwaite
- LNER Class B14, a class of 5 British steam locomotives

== Other uses ==
- Caro–Kann Defence, Encyclopaedia of Chess Openings code
- B14-0,-5 and -7, a series of model rocket engines produced by Estes Industries from approximately 1968-1979
- Boron-14 (B-14 or ^{14}B), an isotope of boron
