= Genetic matchmaking =

Romantic relationships based on biological compatibility

Genetic matchmaking is the idea of matching couples for romantic relationships based on their biological compatibility. The initial idea was conceptualized by Claus Wedekind through his "sweaty t-shirt" experiment. Males were asked to wear T-shirts for two consecutive nights, and then females were asked to smell the T-shirts and rate the body odors for attractiveness. Human body odor has been associated with the human leukocyte antigens (HLA) genomic region. They discovered that females were attracted to men who had dissimilar HLA alleles from them. Furthermore, these females reported that the body odors of HLA-dissimilar males reminded them of their current partners or ex-partners providing further evidence of biological compatibility.

== Research ==
Following research done by Dr. Wedekind, several studies found corroborating evidence for biological compatibility. Garver-Apgar et al. presented evidence for HLA-dissimilar alleles playing a factor in the healthiness of romantic relationships. They discovered that as the proportion of HLA-similar alleles increased between couples, females reported being less sexually responsive to their partners, less satisfaction from being aroused by their partners, and having additional sexual partners (while with their current partner). Additionally, Ober et al. conducted an independent study on a population of American Hutterites by comparing the HLA alleles of married couples. They discovered that married couples were less likely to share HLA alleles than expected from random chance; thus their results were consistent with tendencies for same-HLA alleled partners to avoid mating. Further evidence of the importance of genetic compatibility can be found in the finding that couples sharing a higher proportion of HLA alleles tend to have recurring spontaneous abortions, reduced body mass in babies, and longer intervals between successive births.

The application of this research to find romantic partners via genetic testing has been described as "dubious". Analyses of data from the International HapMap Project has not found a consistent relationship between marital partners and genes related to the immune system.

== Reasons for biological compatibility ==
There are several biological reasons why women would be attracted to and mate with men with dissimilar HLA alleles:

- Their offspring would have a greater assortment of HLA alleles theoretically giving them a wider diversity of antigens present on the surface of cells compared to HLA-homozygous offspring. The wider variety of antigens allows the immune system to target a greater number of pathogens making the offspring more immunocompetent.
- Any HLA allele which becomes a more resistant allele would not simply become an inherent allele in all individuals. Through evolution, there will always be some pathogens that can become resistant to this allele, and spread to create a selection against the allele. HLA-dissortative mating can be considered a method to cause the adaptations that pathogens have to their host to become obsolete in their offspring; In other words, allow us to keep up in the "Red Queen's race".
- HLA genes are highly polymorphic between individuals. Any two individuals with similar HLA genes could be possibly related. Mating of two related individuals would result in inbreeding which can be harmful to the offspring since it would result in a greater amount of genetic homozygosity thus increasing the chances of recessive mutations.
