= B51 =

B51 or B-51 may refer to:

- HLA-B51, an HLA-B serotype
- Bundesstraße 51, a road in western Germany
- Martin XB-51, an American airplane
- Sicilian Defence, in the Encyclopaedia of Chess Openings
- B51 (New York City bus)
