= B41 =

B41 or B-41 may refer to:

- D41 road (Croatia), a Croatian expressway connecting Vrbovec to the Hungarian border
- Bundesstraße 41, a federal highway in Germany
- B41 (New York City bus), a bus route in Brooklyn, New York City, United States
- B41 nuclear bomb, a thermonuclear weapon deployed by the United States in the early 1960s
- HLA-B41, an HLA-B serotype
- B-41 Liberator, an American aircraft during World War II
- B41, Vietnamese designation of RPG-7 rocket-propelled grenade
