= B61 =

B61 may refer to:

- B61 nuclear bomb
- B61 (New York City bus) in Brooklyn
- HLA-B61, an HLA serotype
- Sicilian, Richter-Rauzer, Encyclopaedia of Chess Openings code
- Alternative name for the ephrin A1, human gene

B-61 may refer to:

- B-61 Matador, the first operational surface-to-surface cruise missile built by the United States
