= B81 =

B81 may refer to:

- Sicilian Defence, Scheveningen Variation, Encyclopaedia of Chess Openings code
- HLA-B81, an HLA-B serotype
- Bundesstraße 81, a road in Germany
- Rolls-Royce B81 Engine, a straight-eight petrol engine primarily used in the Alvis Stalwart and FV430 Series Mk 1 vehicles
