= B48 =

B48 may refer to:

- B48 (New York City bus), a bus line in Brooklyn
- HLA-B48, a HLA-B serotype
- Martin XB-48, an American aircraft
- BMW B48, an engine BMW AG produces
