= B59 =

B59 or B-59 may refer to:

- B-59 military hardware:
  - Boeing XB-59, American aircraft model
  - Soviet submarine B-59, a submarine
- B59:
  - European highways:
    - Bundesstraße 59, in the German Bundesstraße system
    - Eisenstädter Straße in the Austrian Landesstraße system
  - Volvo B59 Swedish-market bus chassis
  - HLA-B59, serotype re Human Leucocyte Antigen
  - B59, chess variation arising from 5...Nc6 in Sicilian Defence
  - Barnard 59, AKA Pipe Nebula
