= B67 =

B67 may refer to:

- List of Torchwood items § Amnesia pill
- B67 (New York City bus) in Brooklyn
- Encyclopaedia of Chess Openings code for one of the listed variations of the Richter-Rauzer Attack
- HLA-B67, an HLA-B serotype
- Bundesstraße 67, a German road

B-67 may refer to:

- B-67, a sports club based in Nuuk in Greenland
