= B53 =

B53 or B-53 may refer to:

- B53 nuclear bomb
- HLA-B53, an HLA-B serotype
- Convair XB-53, an American aircraft
