= B45 =

B45 or B-45 may refer to:

- Bundesstraße 45, a German road
- B45 (New York City bus), in Brooklyn, USA
- HLA-B45, a HLA-B serotype
- North American B-45 Tornado, a U.S. Air Force bomber aircraft of the late 1940s
