= HLA-B5 =

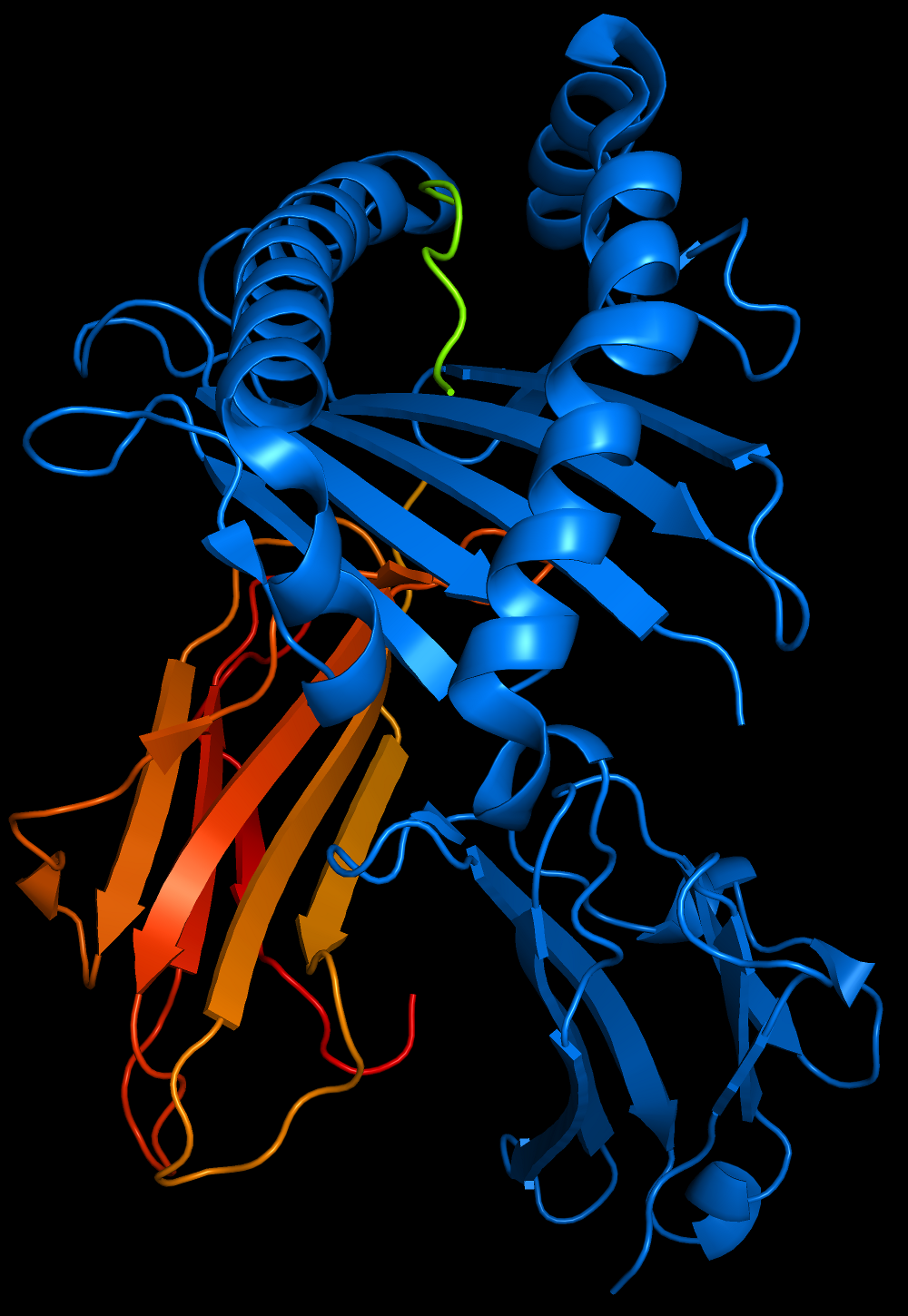
B*5101-β2M with bound peptide 1e28
major histocompatibility complex (human), class I, B51
Split antigens	HLA-B51, HLA-B52

HLA-B5 (B5) is an HLA-B serotype. B5 is a broad antigen serotype that recognizes the B51 and B52 split antigen serotypes.

== Serotype ==
B5, B51, B52 serotype recognition of some HLA B*51 and B*52 allele-group gene products
B*51	B51	B5	B52	Sample
allele	%	%	%	size (N)
5101	96	1	5	1899
5102	73	3	6	218
5104	83	17		6
				'
B*52	B52	B5	B51	Sample
allele	%	%	%	size (N)
5201	82	2	7	2823
