= B56 =

B56 or B-56 may refer to:

- Bundesstraße 56, a German road
- HLA-B56, an HLA-B serotype
- Boeing B-56, an aircraft
