= B6 =

B6 often refers to:

- Vitamin B_{6}

B6 may also refer to:

== Transportation ==
=== Automobiles ===
- A generation of Audi A4, manufactured from 2001 to 2005
- A fully armoured version of the Bentley Arnage Series Two RL
- A member of the Mazda B engine series

=== Aircraft ===
- Blackburn B.6 Shark, a British 1930s torpedo bomber
- Keystone B-6, a United States Army Air Corps bomber
- Lohner B.VI, an Austro-Hungarian World War 1 reconnaissance biplane
- Nakajima B-6, Nakajima designation for Bréguet 14 built under licence in Japan
- Republic B 6, Swedish designation for Republic 2PA fighter
- Bell 206, a light utility helicopter made by Bell Textron from 1962-2017, using the B06 ICAO code.

=== Other vehicles ===
- B6 (New York City bus), serving Brooklyn
- Bavarian B VI, an 1863 German steam locomotive model
- Ceylon Government Railway B6, a class of steam locomotives
- HMS B6, a submarine of the Royal Navy
- HNoMS B-6, a submarine of Norway
- LNER Class B6, a class of British steam locomotives

=== Roads ===
- B6 road (Cyprus), a road on the island of Cyprus
- B6 (Zimbabwe), a road in Zimbabwe
- Bundesstraße 6, a national highway in Germany

== Life sciences ==
- Vitamin B_{6}, a water-soluble compound pyridoxine which takes several forms
- ATC code B06 Other hematological agents, a subgroup of the Anatomical Therapeutic Chemical Classification System
- C57BL/6, an inbred mouse strain

== Other uses ==
- B6 (musician), a Chinese DJ and music producer
- JetBlue Airways (IATA code B6)
- Bensen B-6, a small rotor kite from 1953
- Pilcrow (¶) character, Url encoded version %B6
- Proanthocyanidin B6, a B type proanthocyanidin
- An international standard paper size (125×176 mm), defined in ISO 216
- 6 amp, type B – a standard circuit breaker current rating, commonly used to protect domestic lighting rings
- B6, Villa Park, referring to UK post code for Aston, Birmingham

== See also ==
- 6B (disambiguation)
- B60 (disambiguation)
- BVI (disambiguation)
