= B58 =

B58 may refer to:

- HLA-B58, an HLA-B serotype
- Convair B-58 Hustler, an aircraft
- BMW B58, an engine
