= B82 =

B82 may refer to:

- Sicilian Defence, Scheveningen Variation, according to the list of chess openings
- Bundesstraße 82, a German road
- B82 (New York City bus) in Brooklyn

B*82 may refer to:

- HLA-B*82, an HLA-B serotype
