= B55 =

B55 may refer to:

- Bundesstraße 55, a German road
- Karoonda Highway, a road in South Australia
- HLA-B55, an HLA-B serotype

B-55 may refer to:

- Boeing XB-55, an aircraft
