= B78 =

B78 or B-78 may refer to:

- Obdacher Straße, a road in Austria
- B-78 Jupiter, a missile
- Sicilian Defense, Dragon Variation, according to the Encyclopaedia of Chess Openings
- Tamworth, according to the list of postal districts in the United Kingdom
- HLA-B78, an HLA-B serotype
