= BVI (disambiguation) =

The British Virgin Islands (BVI) is a British Overseas Territory in the Caribbean.

BVI may also refer to:

== Airports ==
- Beaver County Airport (FAA LID airport code BVI), an airport near Beaver, PA, USA
- Birdsville Airport (IATA airport code BVI), Birdsville, Queensland, Australia.

== Groups, companies, organizations ==
- Buena Vista International, a former division of The Walt Disney Company
- Bureau Veritas (Euronext stock market code BVI), testing, inspection, verification company
- BVI Airways (ICAO airline code BVI), a defunct airline of the British Virgin Islands
- Air BVI, a defunct airline of the British Virgin Islands

== Other uses ==
- Belanda Viri language (ISO 639 language code bvi)
- Body volume index, a term used in anthropometry
- Blind and/or visually impaired
- Blade-vortex interaction
- Brand visual identity, the visual presentation of a brand
- Borivali railway station in Mumbai, India

== See also ==
- B6 (disambiguation), including a list of topics named B.VI, etc.
- BVL (disambiguation)
