= B47 =

B47 or B-47 may refer to:

- BMW B47, an inline-four diesel engine
- Bundesstraße 47, a German road
- B47 (New York City bus) in Brooklyn
- HLA-B47, a HLA-B serotype
- B-47 Stratojet, an American aircraft
