= B54 =

B54 or B-54 may refer to:

- B54 (New York City bus), a bus line in Brooklyn
- Blackburn B-54, a British carrier-borne anti-submarine warfare aircraft
- Boeing B-54, an American strategic bomber aircraft
- Bundesstraße 54, a German road
- HLA-B54, an HLA-B serotype
- W54 nuclear warhead, which in one configuration was known as the B54 Special Atomic Demolition Munition (SADM)
