= HLA-B40 =

Human leukocyte antigen serotype

HLA-B40 (B40) is an HLA - B serotype. B40 is composed of the B60 and B61 split antigen serotypes.

== Serotype ==
B60, B40, B61 serotype recognition of some HLA B*40 allele-group gene products
B*40	B60	B40	B61	Sample
allele	%	%	%	size (N)
40:01	93	4	2	3854
B*40	B61	B40	B60	Sample
allele	%	%	%	size (N)
40:02	80	6	8	1460
40:03	62		23	31
40:04	47		12	57
40:06	75	5	5	585

B*40:05 is poorly recognized by B40, B60, or B61.
