= B42 =

B42 may refer to:

- The Gutenberg Bible or the "42-line Bible"
- Bundesstraße 42, a German road
- B42 (New York City bus) in Brooklyn
- HLA-B42, an HLA-B serotype
- B-42 Mixmaster, an American aircraft
