= HLA-B52 =

Human leukocyte antigen serotype

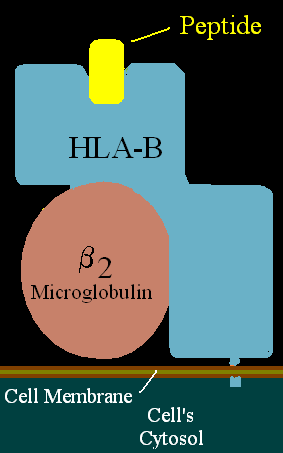
B*5101-β2MG with bound peptide 1e27
major histocompatibility complex (human), class I, B52
Alleles	B*5201, 5202, 5203, . . .
Structure (See HLA-B)
Shared data
Locus	chr.6 6p21.31

HLA-B52 (B52) is an HLA-B serotype. The serotype identifies the more common HLA-B*52 gene products.

B52 is a split antigen of the broad antigen B5, and is a sister type of B51. B*5201 likely formed as a result of a gene conversion event between another HLA-B allele and HLA-B*5101. There are a number of alleles within the B*52 allele group.

== Serotype ==
Serotypes B52, B5, B51, and B53 recognition of HLA B*5201 gene product
B*52	B52	B5	B51	B53	Sample
allele	%	%	%	%	size (N)
*5201	84	2	7	1	2823
Alleles link-out to IMGT/HLA Databease at EBI

HLA *5201 frequencies
		freq
ref.	Population	(%)
	China Yunnan Lisu	21.7
	China Yunnan Nu	18.6
	Bulgaria Gipsy	18.2
	Venezuela Sierra de Perija Yucpa	12.8
	India Andhra Pradesh Golla	12.0
	Japan Central	10.7
	Japan	10.4
	Georgia Tbilisi Kurds	10.3
	Mali Bandiagara	8.3
	South Africa Natal Tamil	8.2
	Israel Ashk. and Non-Ashk. Jews	7.3
	India North Hindus	6.7
	China Beijing	6.1
	India New Delhi	6.1
	India Mumbai Marathas	5.6
	Tunisia Ghannouch	5.5
	Thailand pop3	5.1
	India West Coast Parsis	5.0
	India North Delhi	4.9
	Mexico Mestizos	4.9
	Argentina Toba Rosario	4.7
	Mexico Zaptotec Oaxaca	4.5
	USA Hispanic	4.5
	China Qinghai Hui	4.1
	China Inner Mongolia	3.9
	China North Han	3.8
	Oman	3.8
	Senegal Niokholo Mandenka	3.7
	Bulgaria	3.6
	Thailand	3.5
	Ivory Coast Akan Adiopodoume	3.4
	Venezuela Perja Mountain Bari	3.4
	Italy North pop 1	3.3
	Sudanese	3.3
	Romanian	3.2
	Singapore Riau Malay	3.0
	Autonomous Region Tibetans	2.8
	Russia Tuva pop 2	2.8
	South Korea pop 3	2.8
	Iran Baloch	2.5
	Tunisia	2.5
	Jordan Amman	2.4
	USA Hawaii Okinawa	2.4
	Singapore Javanese Indonesians	2.0
	Spain Eastern Andalusia	1.8
	Macedonia pop 4	1.6
	Uganda Kampala	1.6
	Belgium	1.5
	Mexico Guadalajara Mestizos pop2	1.5
	Singapore Thai	1.5
	Brazil	1.4
	China Yunnan Lisu	1.4
	Azores Santa Maria and Sao Miguel	1.3
	France South East	1.2
	Italy North Pavia	1.2
	Saudi Arabia Guraiat and Hail	1.2
	Mexico Chihuahua State Tarahumara	1.1
	Tunisia Tunis	1.1
	Israel Arab Druse	1.0
	Japan Ainu Hokkaido	1.0
	Portugal Centre	1.0
	Singapore Chinese	1.0
	Taiwan Minnan pop 1	1.0
	USA Caucasian	1.0
	Azores Central Islands	0.9
	China South Han	0.9
	Macedonia pop 4	0.7
	Morocco Nador Metalsa Class I	0.7
	Georgia Svaneti Svans	0.6
	Ireland South	0.6
	Italy Bergamo	0.6

== Alleles ==
There are 18 alleles, with 14 amino acid sequence variants in B52. Of these only 9 are frequent enough to have been reliably serotyped. B*5201 is the most common, but others have a large regional abundance.

== Disease ==
=== In ulcerative colitis ===
HLA-B52 appears to have the strongest linkage to ulcerative colitis in Japan. This form of disease is frequently found with Takayasu's arteritis.

=== In Takayasu's arteritis ===
Takayasu's arteritis appears to have an independent link to B52 associated disease. The association with B*5201 increases risk of pulmonary infarction, ischemic heart disease, aortic regurgitation, systemic hypertension, renal artery stenosis, cerebrovascular disease, and visual disturbance.
