= HLA-B37 =

Human leukocyte antigen serotype

major histocompatibility complex (human), class I, B37
Alleles	B*3701
Structure (See HLA-B)
Symbol(s)	HLA-B
EBI-HLA	B*3701
Locus	chr.6 6p21.31

HLA-B37 (B37) is an HLA-B serotype. The serotype identifies the more common HLA-B*37 gene products. (For terminology help see: HLA-serotype tutorial)

== Serotype ==
B37 serotype recognition of Some HLA B*37 allele-group gene products
B*37	B37		Sample
allele	%	%	size (N)
3701	93		1721
3702	25		4

== Alleles ==
HLA B*3701 frequencies
		freq
ref.	Population	(%)
	Central Africa Republic Mbenzele Pygmy	37.5
	Cameroon Pygmy Baka	15.0
	Burkina Faso Fulani	12.2
	India Tamil Nadu Nadar	9.0
	India Andhra Pradesh Golla	8.7
	Cameroon Sawa	7.7
	China Beijing	4.6
	China Inner Mongolia	3.9
	India North Hindus	3.8
	Spain Mallorca and Menorca	3.3
	France South East	3.1
	Mexico Mestizos	2.4
	China Qinghai Hui	2.3
	Croatia	2.0
	Italy Sardinia pop3	2.0
	Portugal Centre	2.0
	Russia Arkhangelsk Pomors	2.0
	Saudi Arabia Guraiat and Hail	2.0
	Singapore Javanese Indonesians	2.0
	South Africa Natal Tamil	2.0
	China Guangzhou Han	1.9
	China Tibet Autonomous Region Tibetans	1.9
	Spain Eastern Andalusia	1.8
	Cape Verde Northwestern Islands	1.6
	Ireland Northern	1.6
	China Guangzhou	1.5
	Guinea Bissau	1.5
	South Korea pop 3	1.4
	Thailand	1.4
	Wales	1.4
	Azores Santa Maria and Sao Miguel	1.3
	Georgia Svaneti Svans	1.3
	India Jalpaiguri Toto	1.3
	Japan Central	1.3
	Japan pop5	1.3
	India Mumbai Marathas	1.2
	Ireland South	1.2
	USA Caucasian Bethesda	1.2
	India North Delhi	1.1
	Senegal Niokholo Mandenka	1.1
	Cameroon Bakola Pygmy	1.0
	France Corsica	1.0
	India West Bhils	1.0
	Thailand pop3	1.0
