= HLA-B58 =

Human leukocyte antigen serotype

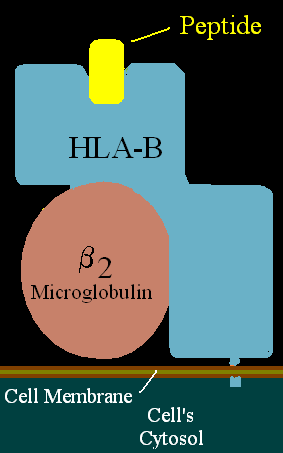
HLA-B (alpha)-β2MG with bound peptide
major histocompatibility complex (human), class I, B58
Alleles	*5801, *5802
Structure (See HLA-B)
Shared data
Locus	chr.6 6p21.31

HLA-B58 (B58) is an HLA-B serotype. B58 is a split antigen from the B17 broad antigen, the sister serotype B57. The serotype identifies the more common HLA-B*58 gene products. (For terminology help see: HLA-serotype tutorial) B*5801 is associated with allopurinol induced inflammatory necrotic skin disease.

== Serotype ==
B58 and B17 serotype recognition of some more common HLA B*58 alleles
B*58	B58	B17	Sample
allele	%	%	size (N)
*5801	79	4	2096
*5802	72	3	837

== Allele distribution ==
HLA B*5801 frequencies
		freq
ref.	Population	(%)
	Cameroon Pygmy Baka	15.0
	India Khandesh Pawra	15.0
	Cameroon Sawa	11.5
	Taiwan Hakka	10.9
	Kenya Nandi	10.0
	India West Bhils	9.0
	China South Han	8.9
	China Inner Mongolia	8.8
	India North Delhi	8.8
	Thailand Northeast	8.4
	Guinea Bissau	7.8
	Thailand	7.7
	India Mumbai Marathas	7.4
	India Andhra Pradesh Golla	7.2
	Kenya Luo	7.0
	Senegal Niokholo Mandenka	6.9
	India New Delhi	6.8
	Oman	6.8
	Russia Tuva (2)	6.7
	South Korea (3)	6.5
	Italy Sardinia (3)	6.4
	Burkina Faso Fulani	6.1
	Taiwan Siraya	5.9
	India North Hindus	5.8
	Burkina Faso Mossi	5.7
	Cameroon Yaounde	5.4
	Cameroon Bamileke	5.2
	Singapore Riau Malay	5.0
	Saudi Arabia Guraiat and Hail	4.6
	France Corsica	4.5
	Sudanese	4.5
	Zimbabwe Harare Shona	4.4
	Burkina Faso Rimaibe	4.3
	Iran Baloch	4.0
	South African Natal Zulu	4.0
	Tunisia	4.0
	Uganda Kampala	4.0
	Cameroon Beti	3.7
	Tunisia Ghannouch	3.7
	Taiwan Pazeh	3.6
	Tunisia Tunis	3.4
	Italy North (1)	3.3
	Israel Ashkenazi and Non Ashkenazi Jews	3.2
	India West Coast Parsis	3.0
	China North Han	2.9
	Ivory Coast Akan Adiopodoume	2.3
	Mali Bandiagara	2.2
	Mexico Zaptotec Oaxaca	2.2
	South Africa Natal Tamil	2.0
	China Yunnan Nu	1.9
	Bulgaria	1.8
	China Tibet Autonomous Region Tibetans	1.6
	France South East	1.6
	Israel Arab Druse	1.5
	Czech Republic	1.4
	Georgia Tbilisi Georgians	1.4
	Jordan Amman	1.4
	Morocco Nador Metalsa (berber)	1.4
	Croatia	1.3
	Romanian	1.3
	Spain Eastern Andalusia	1.2
	Australian Aborigine Cape York Peninsula	1.0
	B*5802
	Cameroon Bamileke	14.3
	Kenya Luo	12.5
	Cameroon Yaounde	10.9
	Cameroon Pygmy Baka	10.0
	Cameroon Beti	9.8
	Kenya Nandi	8.5
	South African Natal Zulu	8.5
	Cameroon Sawa	7.7
	Zimbabwe Harare Shona	6.4
	Cape Verde Northwestern Islands	5.6
	Uganda Kampala	4.4
	Central Africa Republic Mbenzele Pygmy	4.0
	Zambia Lusaka	2.3
	Iran Baloch	1.0
	Tunisia	1.0

== Disease ==
HLA-B*5801 is involved in allopurinol sensitive drug induced Stevens–Johnson syndrome. Allopurinol is a frequent cause of severe cutaneous adverse reactions, including drug-hypersensitivity syndrome, Stevens–Johnson syndrome, and toxic epidermal necrolysis (SJS/TEN). The association with allopurinol sensitivity in SJS/TEN was extremely strong in Asia, and somewhat less associated in Europeans.
