= HLA-B78 =

Genetic HLA-B serotype

major histocompatibility complex (human), class I, B78
Alleles	B*7801; B*7802
Structure (See HLA-B)
Symbol(s)	HLA-B
EBI-HLA	B*7801
EBI-HLA	B*7802
Locus	chr.6 6p21.31

HLA-B78 (B78) is an HLA-B serotype. The serotype identifies the more common HLA-B*78 gene products. B78 is more common in West and North Africa, but is also scattered at low frequencies in parts of Asia. (For terminology help see: HLA-serotype tutorial)

== Serotype ==
B78 serotype recognition of some HLA B*78 allele-group gene products
B*78	B78	other	Sample
allele	%	%	size (N)
7801	41	48	210

== Allele frequencies ==
HLA B*7801 frequencies
		freq
ref.	Population	(%)
	Fulani (Burkina Faso)	8.2
	Bandiagara (Mali)	6.9
	Niokholo Mandinka (Senegal)	5.3
	Mossi (Burkina Faso)	2.8
	Guinea Bissau	2.3
	Akan Adiopodoume (Ivory Coast)	2.3
	Tunis (Tunisia)	2.3
	Berber (Morocco)	1.4
	Rimaibe (Burkina Faso)	1.1
	New Delhi (India)	0.8
	Lisu (Yunnan, China)	0.7
	Beti (Cameroon)	0.6
	Majorca & Minorca (Spain)	0.6
	Gypsy (E. Andalusia, Spain)	0.5
	Tunisia	0.5
	Romanian	0.3
	Northeast Thailand	0.2
	Tibet (China)	0.6
'
HLA B*7802 frequencies
	Svans (Georgia)	0.6
	Arab Druse (Israel)	0.5
	Delhi (India)	0.5
	Southern Han (China)	0.2
	Beijing (China)	0.1
