= HLA-B47 =

Human leukocyte antigen serotype

major histocompatibility complex (human), class I, B47
| Alleles | B*4701; B*4702; B*4703 |
Structure (See HLA-B)
| Symbol(s) | HLA-B |
| EBI-HLA | B*4701 |
| EBI-HLA | B*4702 |
| EBI-HLA | B*4703 |
| Locus | chr.6 6p21.31 |

HLA-B47 (B47) is an HLA–B serotype. The serotype identifies the HLA-B*47 gene products (B*4701, B*4702, B*4703) . Comparison of B47 nucleotide sequence with other HLA-B sequences shows a segment of 228 bp identical with B44 in the alpha 1 domain and a segment of 218 bp identical with B27 in the alpha 2 domain, but only a 91 bp segment of identity with B13 in the alpha 1 domain. The complex pattern of substitutions and their degree of divergence indicate that HLA-B13 and HLA-Bw47 alleles are not related by a simple mutational event. B47 is linked to (close to on the chromosome) a gene that causes adrenal deficiency. B47 is generally low in frequency and with highest known frequencies in Central and Western Africa. (For terminology help see: HLA-serotype tutorial)

== Serotype ==
B47 serotype recognition of Some HLA B*47 allele-group gene products
| B*47 | B47 | Other | Sample |
| allele | % | % | size (N) |
| 4701 | 50 | 37 | 317 |
| 4702 | 40 | 40 | 5 |
| 4703 | 25 | 50 | 4 |

Serotyping for B47 is poor and typing is best performed with SSP-PCR or gene sequencing.

== Disease Associations ==
B47 is linked to Adrenal 21-hydroxylase deficiency. The CYP21 gene is located close to B47 between HLA-B and HLA-DRB1 locus.

== B*4701 frequencies ==
HLA B*4701 frequencies
| | | freq |
| ref. | Population | (%) |
| | Bamileke (Cameroon) | 2.6 |
| | Zapotec (Oaxaca, Mexico) | 2.2 |
| | Niokholo Mandinka (Senegal) | 1.6 |
| | Mbenzele Pygmy (CAR) | 1.5 |
| | Nandi (Kenya) | 1.3 |
| | Sudanese | 1.3 |
| | Yaoundé City (Cameroon) | 1.1 |
| | Lusaka (Zambia) | 1.1 |
| | Central Portugal | 1.0 |
| | Bulgaria | 0.9 |
| | Czech Republic | 0.9 |
| | Cape Verde Islands | 0.8 |
| | Berber (Morocco) | 0.7 |
| | Finland | 0.6 |
| | Svans (Georgia) | 0.6 |
| | Bergamo (Italy) | 0.6 |
| | Romanians | 0.6 |
| | North Delhi ((India)) | 0.5 |
| | Orkney Isles (Scotland) | 0.5 |
| | Basque (Gipuzkoa, Spain) | 0.5 |
| | Southeastern (France) | 0.4 |
| | Oman | 0.4 |
| | Kenya | 0.3 |

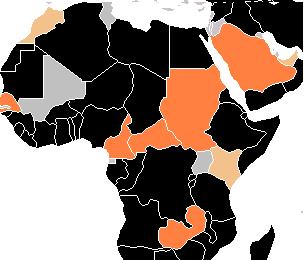
Regions of Africa with Higher B4701 frequencies Orange = 1 to 3% Yellow = 0.1 to 1%
