= HLA-B =

Protein-coding gene in the species Homo sapiens

Identifiers
- Aliases: HLA-B, AS, SPDA1, Bw-47, Bw-50, major histocompatibility complex, class I, B, B-4901, B-5001, HEL-S-83, HLA-B*45ZJ, HLA-B-3506, HLA-B-3905, HLA-B-5502, HLA-B-5602, HLA-B15, HLA-B39, HLA-B49, HLA-B50, HLA-B55, HLA-B59, HLA-B61, HLA-Cw, HLA-DRB1
- External IDs: GeneCards: HLA-B
Available structures
PDB	Human UniProt search: PDBe RCSB
PDB	List of PDB id codes 3VCL, 4U1H, 4U1K, 5EO1, 5EO0,%%s1AGB, 1AGC, 1AGD, 1AGE, 1AGF, 1M05, 1MI5, 3FFC, 3SJV, 3SKM, 3SKO, 3SPV, 3X13, 3X14, 4QRP, 4QRQ, 4QRS, 4QRT, 4QRU,%%s4O2C, 4O2E, 4O2F,%%s3LN4, 3LN5,%%s4U1J, 4U1M, 4U1N,%%s4U1I, 4U1L, 4U1S,%%s1HSA, 1JGD, 1JGE, 1K5N, 1OF2, 1OGT, 1UXS, 1UXW, 1W0V, 1W0W, 2A83, 2BSR, 2BSS, 2BST, 3B3I, 3B6S, 3BP4, 3BP7, 3CZF, 3D18, 3DTX, 3HCV, 3LV3, 4G8G, 4G8I, 4G9D, 4G9F, 5DEF, 5DEG,%%s1A1N, 1A9B, 1A9E, 1CG9, 1XH3, 1ZHK, 1ZHL, 1ZSD, 2AK4, 2AXF, 2AXG, 2H6P, 2NW3, 2NX5, 3BW9, 3BWA, 3KWW, 3KXF, 3LKN, 3LKO, 3LKP, 3LKQ, 3LKR, 3LKS, 3MV7, 3MV8, 3MV9, 3VFS, 3VFT, 3VFU, 3VFV, 3VFW, 4LNR, 4PR5, 4PRN, 4QRR,%%s1A1M, 1A1O,%%s2BVO, 2BVP, 2BVQ, 2HJL, 2RFX, 2YPK, 2YPL, 3UPR, 3VH8, 3VRI, 3VRJ, 3WUW, 3X11, 3X12, 5B39, 5B38,%%s4JQV, 4XXC,%%s1XR8, 1XR9, 3C9N,%%s4LCY,%%s1M6O, 1N2R, 1SYV, 3DX6, 3DX7, 3DX8, 3DXA, 3KPL, 3KPM, 3KPN, 3KPO, 3KPP, 3KPQ, 3KPR, 3KPS, 3L3D, 3L3G, 3L3I, 3L3J, 4JQX,%%s1E27, 1E28, 4MJI,%%s3W39

Gene location (Human)
Chr.	Chromosome 6 (human)
Band	6p21.33	Start	31,353,872 bp
Band	6p21.33	End	31,367,067 bp
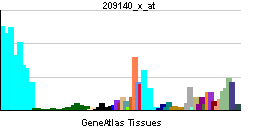
RNA expression pattern
Bgee	Human / Mouse (ortholog); Top expressed in: blood; spleen; granulocyte; upper lobe of left lung; appendix; bone marrow cell; right lung; monocyte; lymph node; epithelium of colon / n/a; More reference expression data
BioGPS	More reference expression data
Gene ontology
Molecular function	signaling receptor binding; peptide antigen binding
Cellular component	integral component of membrane; phagocytic vesicle membrane; Golgi apparatus; early endosome membrane; membrane; Golgi membrane; plasma membrane; integral component of plasma membrane; cell surface; endoplasmic reticulum; MHC class I protein complex; ER to Golgi transport vesicle membrane; integral component of lumenal side of endoplasmic reticulum membrane; extracellular exosome; secretory granule membrane; recycling endosome membrane
Biological process	antigen processing and presentation; antigen processing and presentation of exogenous peptide antigen via MHC class I, TAP-dependent; regulation of interleukin-12 production; interferon-gamma-mediated signaling pathway; immune system process; antigen processing and presentation of peptide antigen via MHC class I; regulation of dendritic cell differentiation; antigen processing and presentation of exogenous peptide antigen via MHC class I, TAP-independent; protection from natural killer cell mediated cytotoxicity; type I interferon signaling pathway; immune response; regulation of immune response; regulation of T cell anergy; viral process; regulation of interleukin-6 production; neutrophil degranulation
Sources:Amigo / QuickGO
Orthologs
Databases	NCBI: entry; OMA: entry
Species	Human	Mouse
Entrez	3106	n/a
Ensembl	ENSG00000228964; ENSG00000234745; ENSG00000206450; ENSG00000224608; ENSG00000223532 ENSG00000232126	n/a
UniProt	P01889	n/a
RefSeq (mRNA)	NM_005514	n/a
RefSeq (protein)	NP_005505	n/a
Location (UCSC)	Chr 6: 31.35 – 31.37 Mb	n/a
PubMed search		n/a
- Wikidata
View/Edit Human

HLA-B (major histocompatibility complex, class I, B) is a human gene that provides instructions for making a protein that plays a critical role in the immune system. HLA-B is part of a family of genes called the human leukocyte antigen (HLA) complex. The HLA complex helps the immune system distinguish the body's own proteins from proteins made by foreign invaders such as viruses and bacteria.

HLA is the human version of the major histocompatibility complex (MHC), a gene family that occurs in many species. Genes in this complex are separated into three basic groups: class I, class II, and class III. In humans, the HLA-B gene and two related genes, HLA-A and HLA-C, are the major genes in MHC class I.

MHC class I genes provide instructions for making proteins that are present on the surface of almost all cells. On the cell surface, these proteins are bound to protein fragments (peptides) that have been exported from within the cell. MHC class I proteins display these peptides to the immune system. If the immune system recognizes the peptides as foreign (such as viral or bacterial peptides), it responds by destroying the infected cell.

The HLA-B gene has many different normal variations, allowing each person's immune system to react to a wide range of foreign invaders. Hundreds of versions (alleles) of HLA-B are known, each of which is given a particular number (such as HLA-B27). Closely related alleles are categorized together; for example, at least 28 very similar alleles are subtypes of HLA-B27. These subtypes are designated as HLA-B*2701 to HLA-B*2728.

The HLA-B gene is located on the short (p) arm of chromosome 6 at cytoband 21.3, from base pair 31,353,871 to 31,357,211

== Related conditions ==
Serotypes of HLA-B gene products
antigen	-	Broad antigen	Split antigens		
B7		B5	B51	B52	
B8		B12	B44	B45	
B13		B14	B64	B65	
B18		B15	B62	B63	B70
B27		B15	B72	B75	B77
B35		B16	B38	B39	
B37		B17	B57	B58	
B41		B21	B49	B50	
B42		B22	B54	B55	B56
B46		B40	B60	B61	
B47					
B48					
B53					
B59					
B67					
B73					
B78					
B81					
B*82					
B*83					
"HLA-" prefix trimmed from serotype names.

Ankylosing spondylitis: A version of the HLA-B gene called HLA-B27 increases the risk of developing ankylosing spondylitis. It is uncertain how HLA-B27 causes this increased risk. Researchers speculate that HLA-B27 may abnormally display to the immune system peptides that trigger arthritis. Other research suggests that joint inflammation characteristic of this disorder may result from improper folding of the HLA-B27 protein or the presence of abnormal forms of the protein on the cell surface. Although most patients with ankylosing spondylitis have the HLA-B27 variation, many people with this particular variation never develop the disorder. Other genetic and environmental factors are likely to affect the chances of developing ankylosing spondylitis and influence its progression.

In addition to Ankylosing spondylitis, HLA-B27 is associated with other spondyloarthropathies, a group of related inflammatory joint diseases. Some of these diseases are associated with a common skin condition called psoriasis or chronic inflammatory bowel disorders (Crohn's disease and ulcerative colitis). One of the spondyloarthropathies, reactive arthritis, is typically triggered by bacterial infections of the gastrointestinal or genital tract. Following an infection, affected individuals may develop arthritis, back pain, and eye inflammation. Like ankylosing spondylitis, many factors probably contribute to the development of reactive arthritis and other spondyloarthropathies.

A large number of studies have shown an association between HLA-B51 And Behçet's disease.

Other disorders: Several variations of the HLA-B gene are associated with adverse reactions to certain drugs. For example, two specific versions of this gene are related to increased drug sensitivity among the Han Chinese population. Individuals who have HLA-B*1502 are more likely to experience a severe skin disorder called Stevens–Johnson syndrome in response to carbamazepine (a drug used to treat seizures). Another version, HLA-B*5801, is associated with an increased risk of severe skin reactions in people treated with allopurinol (a drug used to treat gout, which is a form of arthritis caused by uric acid in the joints).

Among people with human immunodeficiency virus (HIV) infection, a version of HLA-B designated HLA-B*5701 is associated with an increased risk of hypersensitivity reactions to abacavir, a nucleoside reverse transcriptase inhibitor used to treat HIV. Abacavir hypersensitivity reactions often result in fever, chills, rash, upset stomach, and other constitutional symptoms. Screening for the HLA-B*5701 allele has been shown to reduce the incidence of hypersentivity reactions.

Several other variations of the HLA-B gene appear to play a role in the progression of HIV infection to acquired immunodeficiency syndrome (AIDS). AIDS is a disease that damages the immune system, preventing it from effectively defending the body against infections. The signs and symptoms of AIDS may not appear until 10 years or more after infection with HIV. Studies suggest that people with HIV infection who have HLA-B27 or HLA-B57 tend to progress more slowly than usual to AIDS. On the other hand, researchers believe that HIV-positive individuals who have HLA-B35 tend to develop the signs and symptoms of AIDS more quickly than usual. Other factors also influence the progression of HIV to AIDS.

Another version of the HLA-B gene, HLA-B53, has been shown to help protect against severe malaria. HLA-B53 is most common in West African populations, where malaria is a frequent cause of death in children. Researchers suggest that this version of the HLA-B gene may help the immune system respond more effectively to the parasite that causes malaria.

== HLA-B and graft compatibility ==
HLA-B is one of three major HLAs that should be matched between donors and recipients. They are HLA-A, HLA-B, (both Class I MHCs) and HLA-DR (a Class II MHC). If the two tissues have the same genes coding for these three HLAs, the likelihood and severity of rejection is minimized.

== See also ==
- HCP5
