= HLA-B60 =

Human leukocyte antigen serotype

HLA-B60 (B60) is an HLA - B serotype. B60 is a split antigen serotype that recognizes certain B40 serotypes.

== Serotype ==
B60, B40, B61 serotype recognition of some HLA B*40 allele-group gene products
B*40	B60	B40	B61	Sample
allele	%	%	%	size (N)
4001	93	4	2	3854
