= Major histocompatibility complex, class II, DP alpha 1 =

Human gene

HLA-DPA1

Identifiers
- Aliases: HLA-DPA1, DP(W3), DP(W4), HLA-DP1A, HLADP, HLASB, PLT1, major histocompatibility complex, class II, DP alpha 1, DPA1, HLA-DPB1, HLA-DPA, Major histocompatibility complex, class II, DP alpha 1
- External IDs: OMIM: 142880; GeneCards: HLA-DPA1
Available structures
PDB	Human UniProt search: PDBe RCSB
PDB	List of PDB id codes 3LQZ, 4P4K, 4P4R, 4P57, 4P5K, 4P5M

Gene location (Human)
Chr.	Chromosome 6 (human)
Band	6p21.32	Start	33,064,569 bp
Band	6p21.32	End	33,080,775 bp
RNA expression pattern
Bgee	Human / Mouse (ortholog); Top expressed in: monocyte; granulocyte; appendix; lymph node; gallbladder; spleen; right lung; upper lobe of left lung; smooth muscle tissue; duodenum / n/a; More reference expression data
BioGPS	n/a
Gene ontology
Molecular function	peptide antigen binding; MHC class II receptor activity
Cellular component	integral component of membrane; endocytic vesicle membrane; clathrin-coated endocytic vesicle membrane; endosome; Golgi apparatus; trans-Golgi network membrane; endoplasmic reticulum membrane; membrane; Golgi membrane; plasma membrane; transport vesicle membrane; integral component of plasma membrane; MHC class II protein complex; cell surface; lysosomal membrane; endoplasmic reticulum; ER to Golgi transport vesicle membrane; lysosome; integral component of lumenal side of endoplasmic reticulum membrane; endosome membrane; intracellular membrane-bounded organelle
Biological process	antigen processing and presentation; antigen processing and presentation of exogenous peptide antigen via MHC class II; interferon-gamma-mediated signaling pathway; immune system process; positive regulation of interferon-gamma production; antigen processing and presentation of peptide or polysaccharide antigen via MHC class II; positive regulation of T cell activation; immune response; positive regulation of T cell proliferation; cellular response to interferon-gamma; T cell receptor signaling pathway; adaptive immune response
Sources:Amigo / QuickGO
Orthologs
Databases	NCBI: entry; OMA: entry
Species	Human	Mouse
Entrez	3113	n/a
Ensembl	ENSG00000229685; ENSG00000224103; ENSG00000206291; ENSG00000168384; ENSG00000228163 ENSG00000236177; ENSG00000235844; ENSG00000231389	n/a
UniProt	P20036	n/a
RefSeq (mRNA)	NM_001242524; NM_001242525; NM_033554; NM_001405020	n/a
RefSeq (protein)	NP_001229453; NP_001229454; NP_291032	n/a
Location (UCSC)	Chr 6: 33.06 – 33.08 Mb	n/a
PubMed search		n/a
- Wikidata
View/Edit Human

major histocompatibility complex, class II, DP alpha 1

Identifiers
- Symbol: HLA-DPA1
- Alt. symbols: HLA-DP1A
- NCBI gene: 3113
- HGNC: 4938
- OMIM: 142880
- RefSeq: NM_033554
- UniProt: P20036

Other data
- Locus: Chr. 6 p21.3
Search for
- Structures: Swiss-model
- Domains: InterPro

Major histocompatibility complex, class II, DP alpha 1, also known as HLA-DPA1, is a human gene.

== Function ==
The protein encoded by this gene belongs to the HLA class II alpha chain paralogues. The class II molecule is a heterodimer consisting of an alpha (DPA) and a beta chain (DPB), both anchored in the membrane. It plays a central role in the immune system by presenting peptides derived from extracellular proteins. Class II molecules are expressed in antigen-presenting cells (APC: B lymphocytes, dendritic cells, macrophages).

== Gene structure and polymorphisms ==
The alpha chain is approximately 33-35 kDa. It is encoded by 5 exons, exon one encodes the leader peptide, exons 2 and 3 encode the two extracellular domains, exon 4 encodes the transmembrane and the cytoplasmic tail. Within the DP molecule both the alpha chain and the beta chain contain the polymorphisms specifying the peptide binding specificities, resulting in up to 4 different molecules.

== See also ==
- Major histocompatibility complex
- Human leukocyte antigen
- HLA-DP
