= HLA-B14 =

Human leukocyte antigen serotype

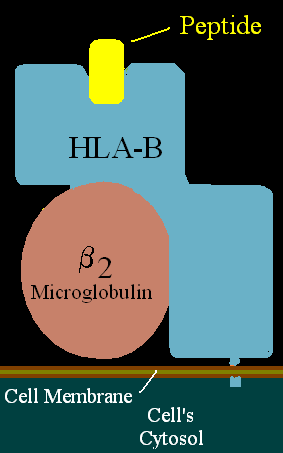
HLA-B (alpha)-β2MG with bound peptide
major histocompatibility complex (human), class I, B14
| Alleles | B*1401, 1402 . . |
Structure (See HLA-B)
Shared data
| Locus | chr.6 6p21.31 |

HLA-B14 (B14) is a HLA-B serotype. The serotype identifies the B*45 gene-allele protein products of HLA-B.

B14 is a broad antigen composed to two, B64 and B65, split antigens. In the case of B14 the recognition of the broad antigen is more useful than split antigen recognition because of the relatively poor discrimination of the split antigens (see Table below).

== Serotype ==
B14, B64, B65 serotype recognition of some HLA B*14 allele-group gene products
| B*14 | B14 | B64 | B65 | Sample |
| allele | % | % | % | size (N) |
| *1401 | 72 | 10 | 10 | 1006 |
| *1402 | 71 | 2 | 25 | 2244 |
| *1403 | 50 | | 35 | 40 |
Alleles link-out to IMGT/HLA Databease at EBI

=== HLA-B64 ===
This serotype does not have good recognition of any of the alleles, relatively speaking recognizes B*1401 better.

=== HLA-B65 ===
This serotype recognizes B*1402 and B*1403 but less so than B14 and to a minor degree it recognized B*1401.
