= HLA-B54 =

Human leukocyte antigen serotype

major histocompatibility complex (human), class I, B54
Alleles	B*5401
Structure (See HLA-B)
Symbol(s)	HLA-B
EBI-HLA	B*5401
Locus	chr.6 6p21.31

HLA-B54 (B54) is an HLA-B serotype. B54 is a split antigen from the B22 broad antigen, sister serotypes are B55 and B56. The serotype identifies the more common HLA-B*55 gene products.

== Serotype ==
B54 and B22 serotype recognition of HLA B*5401 allele
B*54	B54	B22	Sample
allele	%	%	size (N)
5401	67	3	631

== Allele distribution ==
HLA B*5401 frequencies
		freq
ref.	Population	(%)
	USA Hawaii Okinawa	10.6
	Japan Central	7.7
	South Korea (3)	5.9
	China Guangzhou	4.5
	Thailand (3)	4.1
	China Inner Mongolia	3.4
	China North Han	3.3
	China Beijing Shijiazhuang Tianjian Han	3.0
	China South Han	2.5
	Russia Tuva pop 2	2.2
	China Guangxi Maonan	1.9
	Thailand	1.8
	Taiwan Thao	1.7
	China Tibet Autonomous Region Tibetans	1.3

== See also ==
- HLA-serotype tutorial
