= HLA-B61 =

Serotype

HLA-B61 (B61) is an HLA - B serotype. B61 is a split antigen serotype that recognizes certain B40 serotypes.

== Serotype ==
B61, B40, B60 serotype recognition of some HLA B*40 allele-group gene products
B*40	B61	B40	B60	Sample
allele	%	%	%	size (N)
4002	80	6	8	1460
4003	62		23	31
4004	47		12	57
4006	75	5	5	585
