= HLA-B42 =

Human leukocyte antigen serotype

major histocompatibility complex (human), class I, B42
Alleles	B*4201; B*4202
Structure (See HLA-B)
Symbol(s)	HLA-B
EBI-HLA	B*4201
EBI-HLA	B*4202
Locus	chr.6 6p21.31

HLA-B42 (B42) is an HLA-B serotype. The serotype identifies the HLA-B*4201 and *4202 gene products. HLA-B*4201 is common in Central Africa. (For terminology help see: HLA-serotype tutorial)

== Serotype ==
B42 serotype recognition of Some HLA B*42 allele-group gene products
B*42	B42	other	Sample
allele	%	%	size (N)
4201	93	2	1015
4202	95		80

Serological typing for B*4201 and B*4202 is relatively efficient.

=== B*4201 allele frequencies ===
HLA B*4201 frequencies
		freq
ref.	Population	(%)
	Zambia Lusaka	14.8
	Mali Bandiagara	13.8
	Burkina Faso Mossi	13.2
	South African Natal Zulu	12.0
	Burkina Faso Rimaibe	9.6
	South Africa Tswana	8.5
	Kenya Luo	7.7
	Kenya	7.3
	Kenya Nandi	6.9
	Zimbabwe Harare Shona	6.9
	Saudi Arabia	5.6
	Cameroon Yaounde	4.9
	Cameroon Beti	4.0
	Cameroon Bamileke	3.9
	Cameroon Sawa	3.8
	Ivory Coast Akan Adiopodoume	3.4
	Israel Gaza Palestinians	2.4
	India North Delhi	2.2
	Senegal Niokholo Mandenka	1.6
	Mbenzele Pygmy (C. Afr. Rep.)	1.5
	Iran Baloch	1.5
	Pakistan Baloch	1.5
	Sudanese	1.5
	Tunisia	1.5
	Pakistan Brahui	1.4
	Cameroon Bamileke	1.3
	Oman	1.3
	Sudanese	1.3
	Tunisia Tunis	1.1
	Zimbabwe Harare Shona	1.1
	Cameroon Bakola Pygmy	1.0
	Pakistan Pathan	1.0
	Portugal Centre	1.0
	Saudi Arabia Guraiat and Hail	1.0
	Morocco Casablanca	0.9
	Senegal Dakar	0.9
	Uganda Kampala	0.9
	Cape Verde Southeastern Islands	0.8
	Guinea Bissau	0.8
	United Arab Emerates	0.8
	Morocco Nador Metalsa Class I	0.7
	Pakistan Karachi Parsi	0.6
	Spain Majorca	0.6
	China Yunnan Han pop2	0.5
	England Newcastle	0.5
	Israel Arab Druse	0.5
	Israel Jews	0.5
	Italy Rome	0.5
	Guadalajara Mestizos (2) (Mexico)	0.5
	Morocco	0.5
	Pakistan Sindhi	0.5
	Senegal Niokholo Mandenka	0.5
	Singapore Riau Malay	0.5
