= HLA-B53 =

Human leukocyte antigen serotype

major histocompatibility complex (human), class I, B53
Alleles	B*5301; B*5302
Structure (See HLA-B)
Symbol(s)	HLA-B
EBI-HLA	B*5301
EBI-HLA	B*5302
Locus	chr.6 6p21.31

HLA-B53 (B53) is an HLA-B serotype. The serotype identifies the more common HLA-B*53 gene products. The B53 sequence is identical to B35 but short sequence specifies a Bw4 rather than a Bw6 motif (as found in B35), indicating B53 is a recent product of gene conversion. This suggests an origin for HLA-B53 involving a gene conversion of HLA-B35 by an allele containing this Bw4 sequence. (For terminology help see: HLA-serotype tutorial)

== Serotype ==
B53 and B35 serotype recognition of Some HLA B*35 allele-group gene products
B*53	B53	B35	Sample
allele	%	%	size (N)
5301	86	5	3054
5302	80	20	5

== B*5301 allele frequencies ==
HLA B*7801 frequencies
		freq
ref.	Population	(%)
	Akan Adiopodoume (Ivory Coast)	22.7
	Rimaibe (Burkina Faso)	22.3
	Mossi (Burkina Faso)	20.8
	Bandiagara (Mali)	15.9
	Sawa (Cameroon)	11.5
	Lusaka (Zambia)	10.2
	Baka Pygmy (Cameroon)	10.0
	Guinea Bissau	10.0
	Harare Shona (Zimbabwe)	9.3
	Baloch (Iran)	9.1
	Kenya	8.7
	Canoncito Navajo (USA)	8.5
	Brahui (Pakistan)	7.7
	Niokholo Mandenka (Senegal)	5.3
	Croatia (2)	5.0
	Mongolia Khoton Tarialan	4.9
	Pakistan Baloch	4.6
	Casablanca (Morocco)	3.7
	Arratia Basque (Spain)	3.3
	Crete (Greece)	3.2
	Israel Arab Druse	2.5
	Israel Gaza Palestinians	2.4
	Amman (Jordan )	2.4
	Tunis (Tunisia )	2.3
	Tuva (2) (Russia)	2.2
	Oman	2.1
	France South East	1.6
	Saudi Arabia Guraiat and Hail	1.5
	Berber (Morocco)	1.4
	Georgia Svaneti Svans	1.3
	Mongolia Khalkh Ulaanbaatar	1.2
	Spain Catalonia Girona	1.1
	India Andhra Pradesh Golla	1.0
	Mongolia Khalha	1.0

== Haplotype frequencies ==
A*3601 : Cw*0401 : B*5301
		freq
ref.	Population	(%)
	Zimbabwe	3.6
	Zambia Lusaka	2.3
	N. Afr. Negroid	2.1
	Kenya Luo	1.9
	Cameroon Yaounde	1.7
	African American	1.5
	Kenya Nandi	1.3
	American Hispanic	0.2
'
A*6802 : Cw*0401 : B*5301
	Mali Bandihagara	2.7
	African American	1.4
	Kenya Nandi	1.0
	Hispanic American	0.6
	Caucasian American	0.2

Despite its low frequency, the A36-Cw4-B53 haplotype is one of the most common A-Cw-B haplotypes, as it is the 4th most common in African Americans.
