= HLA-B22 =

Human leukocyte antigen serotype

HLA-B22 (B22) is an HLA - B serotype. B22 is a broad antigen serotype that recognizes the B54, B55, and B56 split antigen serotypes.
