= B60 =

B60 may refer to:

- HLA-B60, an HLA-B serotype
- B60 (New York City bus) in Brooklyn
- Sicilian, Richter-Rauzer, Encyclopaedia of Chess Openings code
- Bundesstraße 60, a German road
- a United Kingdom postcode area covering the town of Bromsgrove, Worcestershire
- Rolls-Royce B60 Engine, an inline-six petrol engine primarily used in the Daimler Ferret armoured car
- Bruxner Highway has route number B60 between Ballina and Tenterfield in New South Wales, Australia

B-60 may refer to:

- Convair YB-60, an American aircraft
