= HLA-B41 =

Human leukocyte antigen serotype

major histocompatibility complex (human), class I, B41
Alleles	B*4101; B*4102; B*4103
Structure (See HLA-B)
Symbol(s)	HLA-B
EBI-HLA	B*4101
EBI-HLA	B*4102
EBI-HLA	B*4103
Locus	chr.6 6p21.31

HLA-B41 (B41) is an HLA-B serotype. The serotype identifies HLA-B*4101, *4102, *4103 gene products. (For terminology help see: HLA-serotype tutorial)

== Serotype ==
B41 serotype recognition of Some HLA B*41 allele-group gene products
B*41	B41		Sample
allele	%	%	size (N)
4101	87		543
4102	87		478
4103	91		11

== Allele frequencies ==
HLA B*4101 frequencies
		freq
ref.	Population	(%)
	Cameroon Pygmy Baka	20.0
	Cameroon Sawa	15.4
	Bulgaria Gipsy	9.1
	Sudanese	6.8
	Israel Arab Druse	5.5
	Cameroon Bakola Pygmy	4.0
	Saudi Guraiat and Hail	3.9
	Kenya Nandi	3.1
	Bulgaria	2.7
	Burkina Faso Mossi	1.9
	Israeli Jews	1.8
	Finland	1.7
	France South East	1.6
	Macedonia	1.6
	Czech Republic	1.4
	Kenya	1.4
	Romanian	1.4
	Mexico Mestizos	1.2
	Spain Eastern Andalusia	1.2
	Brazil Belo Horizonte	1.1
	Burkina Faso Rimaibe	1.1
	Kenya Luo	1.1
	Zambia Lusaka	1.1
	Jordan Amman	1.0
	Tunisia	1.0

HLA B*4102 frequencies
		freq
ref.	Population	(%)
	Cameroon Bakola Pygmy	12.0
	Morocco Nador Metalsa	6.5
	Tunisia Tunis	5.7
	Cameroon Pygmy Baka	5.0
	C. Afr. Rep. Mbenzele	4.0
	Cameroon Sawa	3.8
	Zambia Lusaka	2.3
	Portugal North	2.2
	Czech Republic	1.9
	Saudi Guraiat and Hail	1.5
	Tunisia	1.5
	Senegal Niokholo Mandenka	1.1
	Croatia	1.0
	Portugal South	1.0
