= HCP5 =

Identifiers
- Aliases: HCP5, 6S2650E, D6S2650E, P5-1, HLA complex P5 (non-protein coding), HLA complex P5
- External IDs: OMIM: 604676; GeneCards: HCP5
Orthologs
Databases	NCBI: entry; OMA: entry
Species	Human	Mouse
Entrez	10866	n/a
Ensembl	ENSG00000206337	n/a
UniProt	Q6MZN7	n/a
RefSeq (mRNA)	n/a	n/a
RefSeq (protein)	n/a	n/a
Location (UCSC)	n/a	n/a
PubMed search		n/a
- Wikidata
View/Edit Human

The gene known as HCP5 (HLA Complex P5) is a human endogenous retrovirus, meaning that it is a fossil of an ancient virus that at one time infected people, but has now become an integral part of the human genome.

One variation of HCP5 appears to provide some delay or resistance to the development of AIDS when a person is infected with HIV. This variation of HCP5 frequently occurs in conjunction with a particular version of an immune system gene called HLA-B.

HCP5 has been reported to become upregulated after human papillomavirus infection and may promote the development of cervical cancer.
