= HLA-DPB1 =

Protein-coding gene in the species Homo sapiens

Identifiers
- Aliases: HLA-DPB1, DPB1, HLA-DP, HLA-DP1B, HLA-DPB, major histocompatibility complex, class II, DP beta 1
- External IDs: OMIM: 142858; GeneCards: HLA-DPB1
Available structures
PDB	Human UniProt search: PDBe RCSB
PDB	List of PDB id codes 3LQZ, 4P4K, 4P4R, 4P57, 4P5K, 4P5M

Gene location (Human)
Chr.	Chromosome 6 (human)
Band	6p21.32	Start	33,075,990 bp
Band	6p21.32	End	33,089,696 bp
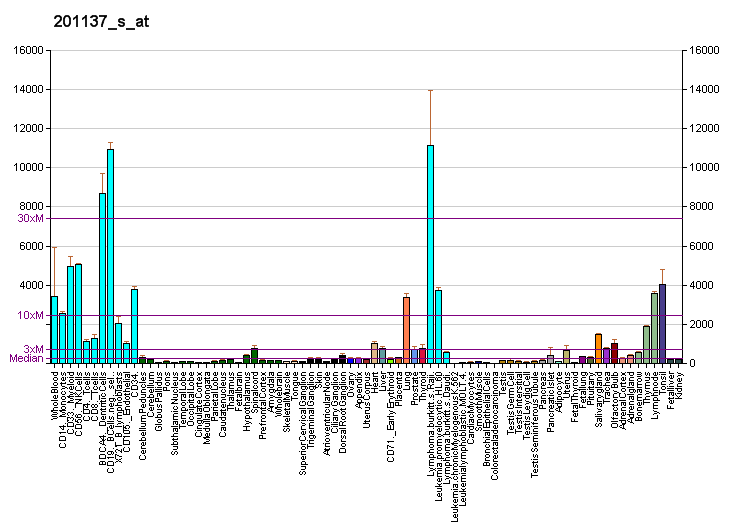
RNA expression pattern
Bgee	Human / Mouse (ortholog); Top expressed in: granulocyte; lymph node; appendix; monocyte; gallbladder; spleen; upper lobe of left lung; right lung; duodenum; right coronary artery / n/a; More reference expression data
BioGPS	More reference expression data
Gene ontology
Molecular function	peptide antigen binding
Cellular component	integral component of membrane; endocytic vesicle membrane; clathrin-coated endocytic vesicle membrane; endosome; Golgi apparatus; trans-Golgi network membrane; endoplasmic reticulum membrane; membrane; Golgi membrane; plasma membrane; transport vesicle membrane; MHC class II protein complex; cell surface; lysosomal membrane; endoplasmic reticulum; ER to Golgi transport vesicle membrane; lysosome; integral component of lumenal side of endoplasmic reticulum membrane; endosome membrane
Biological process	antigen processing and presentation; antigen processing and presentation of exogenous peptide antigen via MHC class II; interferon-gamma-mediated signaling pathway; immune system process; T cell costimulation; positive regulation of interferon-gamma production; antigen processing and presentation of peptide or polysaccharide antigen via MHC class II; positive regulation of T cell activation; positive regulation of T cell proliferation; immune response; T cell receptor signaling pathway; adaptive immune response
Sources:Amigo / QuickGO
Orthologs
Databases	NCBI: entry; OMA: entry
Species	Human	Mouse
Entrez	3115	n/a
Ensembl	ENSG00000236693; ENSG00000230708; ENSG00000229295; ENSG00000226826; ENSG00000215048 ENSG00000223865; ENSG00000230763; ENSG00000237710	n/a
UniProt	P04440	n/a
RefSeq (mRNA)	NM_002121	n/a
RefSeq (protein)	NP_002112	n/a
Location (UCSC)	Chr 6: 33.08 – 33.09 Mb	n/a
PubMed search		n/a
- Wikidata
View/Edit Human

HLA class II histocompatibility antigen, DP(W2) beta chain is a protein that in humans is encoded by the HLA-DPB1 gene.

HLA-DPB belongs to the HLA class II beta chain paralogues. This class II molecule is a heterodimer consisting of an alpha (DPA) and a beta chain (DPB), both anchored in the membrane. It plays a central role in the immune system by presenting peptides derived from extracellular proteins. Class II molecules are expressed in antigen presenting cells (APC: B lymphocytes, dendritic cells, macrophages). The beta chain is approximately 26-28 kDa and its gene contains 6 exons. Exon one encodes the leader peptide, exons 2 and 3 encode the two extracellular domains, exon 4 encodes the transmembrane domain and exon 5 encodes the cytoplasmic tail. Within the DP molecule both the alpha chain and the beta chain contain the polymorphisms specifying the peptide binding specificities, resulting in up to 4 different molecules.

== See also ==
- Major histocompatibility complex
- Human leukocyte antigen
- HLA-DP
