= HLA-B7 =

Human leukocyte antigen serotype

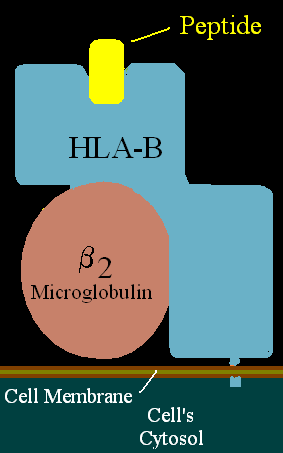
major histocompatibility complex (human), class I, B7
Alleles	B*0702, *0703, *0704, *0705
Structure (See HLA-B)
Alleles (See Serotyping)
Locus	chr.6 6p21.31

HLA-B7 (B7) is an HLA-B serotype. The serotype identifies the more common HLA-B*07 gene products. (For terminology help see: HLA-serotype tutorial) B7, previously HL-A7, was one of the first 'HL-A' antigens recognized, largely because of the frequency of B*0702 in Northern and Western Europe and the United States. B7 is found in two major haplotypes in Europe, where it reaches peak frequency in Ireland. One haplotype A3-B7-DR15-DQ1 can be found over a vast region and is in apparent selective disequilibrium. B7 is a risk factor for cervical cancer, sarcoidosis, and early-onset spondylarthropathies.

== Serology ==
B7 serotype recognition of Some HLA B*07 allele-group gene products
B*07	B7	Sample
allele	%	size (N)
*0702	98	10841
*0703	93	15
*0704	89	44
*0705	95	42
*0706	96	23
*0707	92	13
*0709	78	9
Alleles link-out to IMGT/HLA Databease at EBI

== Alleles ==
HLA B*0702 frequencies
		freq
ref.	Population	(%)
	Ireland South	17.6
	Ireland Northern	17.3
	Australia New South Wales	12.0
	Croatia	9.7
	Azores S. Maria & Miguel	9.0
	Cameroon Beti	8.6
	Saudi Arabia Guraiat and Hail	8.3
	Azores Central Islands	8.0
	France South East	7.2
	Cameroon Bamileke	7.1
	Portugal Centre	7.0
	Italy North pop 1	6.7
	Japan Central	6.5
	Czech Republic	6.1
	Uganda Kampala	5.9
	Mali Bandiagara	5.8
	Senegal Niokholo Mandenka	5.8
	India Mumbai Marathas	4.9
	Zambia Lusaka	4.6
	Zimbabwe Harare Shona	4.6
	South African Natal Zulu	4.5
	Romanian	3.7
	South Korea (3)	3.5
	Shijiazhuang Tianjian Han, China	3.4
	India North Delhi	3.3
	Kenya Luo	2.5
	China Guangzhou Han	2.4
	Mexico Chihuahua Tarahumara	2.3
	Sudanese	2.3
	Singapore Javanese Indonesians	2.0
	Spain Eastern Andalusia Gipsy	2.0
	New Caledonia	1.9
	Oman	1.7
	USA Alaska Yupik Natives	1.6
	China Beijing	1.5
	Tunisia	1.5
	Argentina Toba Rosario	1.2
	Singapore Chinese Han	1.2
	USA Arizona Pima	1.1
	American Samoa	1.0
	Japan Ainu Hokkaido	1.0
	Kenya Nandi	1.0
	Portugal South	1.0
	Singapore Riau Malay	1.0
	Singapore Thai	1.0

== In disease ==
=== Cervical cancer ===
HLA-B7 along with HLA-DQ8 increased risk for cervical cancer in Costa Rican and South Asian women

=== Sarcoidosis ===
A weak relationship between HLA-B7 and sarcoidosis has been known for 30+ years, yet has not consistently been reproducible in all studies however. A common serologically defined haplotype in Europeans is HLA A3-Cw7-B7-DR15-DQ6.2 which is composed of alleles A*0301:Cw*0701:B*0702:DRB1*1501:DQA1*0102:DQB1*0602. In persistent sarcoidosis this haplotype appears elevated, further study eliminated risk contributed by A3-Cw7 and DQ6.2 indicating B7-DR15 haplotype contains risk of disease (OR = 2.5). Corresponding region of chromosome 6 contains nearly one million nucleotides thus these genes, or another closely linked gene could be involved in such massing of inflammatory granulomata.

=== Juvenile Spondylarthropathies ===
In Croatian children, two HLA-B27 alleles were found associated with disease, B*2702, B*2705. The study showed also B*0702 in cooperation with B*27, the HLA-B*07/B*27 combination with D6S273-134 genomic marker allele and was found not to be the result of linkage disequilibrium. B*2705 was found to be dominant allele associated.

=== Haemochromatosis ===
The HFE gene responsible for haemochromatosis is distal on chromosome 6 from HLA-A and more so from HLA-B, the distance suffices (3 million nucleotides) to allow equilibration of the loci. Nonetheless, a linkage has been found between A3-B7 haplotype and haemochromatosis. The region is almost 1.4 million nucleotides in length and contains many other genes that could be involved. A more recent study looked at a number of linked gene-alleles and found I82-2:D6S265-1:HLA-A3:D6S128-2:HLA-F1:D6S105-8 was constantly associated while B7 appeared beyond the haplotype linked to disease.

=== Covid-19 ===
In october 2021, a team of researcher from Centre hospitalier universitaire Sainte-Justine in Montreal, Canada, announced the discovery of HLA-B7 genetic marker as a potential cause for severe form of covid-19. While they noted that more work will be necessary to confirm this discovery, they found that individuals carrying the HLA-B7 genetic marker, which represents 35% of the population worldwide, are more likely to have a less effective immune response to covid-19.
