= Claus Wedekind =

Swiss biologist

Claus Wedekind is a Swiss biologist notable for his 1995 study that determined a major histocompatibility complex (MHC)-dependent mate preference in humans.

In this study, which involved sweaty T-shirts, men each wore the same T-shirt for two days. The shirts were then put into identical boxes. Various women were asked to smell the shirts, and to indicate to which shirts they were most sexually attracted. The results showed that women were most attracted to men with an MHC most dissimilar from their own.

== MHC and sexual selection ==
It has been suggested that MHC plays a role in the selection of potential mates, via olfaction. MHC genes make molecules that enable the immune system to recognise invaders; generally, the more diverse the MHC genes of the parents, the stronger the immune system of the offspring. It would obviously be beneficial, therefore, to have a system of recognizing individuals with different MHC genes and preferentially selecting them to breed with. Yamazaki et al. (1976) showed this to be the case for male mice, who show such a preference for females of different MHC. Similar results have been obtained with fish.

In a 1995 experiment by Wedekind, a group of female college students smelled t-shirts that had been worn by male students for two nights, without deodorant, cologne or scented soaps. Overwhelmingly, the women preferred the odors of men with dissimilar MHCs to their own. However, their preference was reversed if they were taking oral contraceptives. The hypothesis is that MHCs affect mate choice and that oral contraceptives can interfere with this. A study in 2005 showed similar results.

== See also ==
- Pheromone

== Bibliography ==
- Daniel M. Davis, The Compatibility Gene, London, Penguin Books, 2014 (ISBN 978-0-241-95675-5).
