= HLA-B48 =

Human leukocyte antigen serotype

major histocompatibility complex (human), class I, B48
Alleles	B*4801; B*4802; B*4803
Structure (See HLA-B)
Symbol(s)	HLA-B
EBI-HLA	B*4801
EBI-HLA	B*4802
EBI-HLA	B*4803
Locus	chr.6 6p21.31

HLA-B48 (B48) is an HLA-B serotype. The serotype identifies the more common HLA-B*48 gene products. B48 is most common along the West Pacific Rim, Americas indigenous peoples and Northern Eurasians. B*4801 is part of a group of alleles including B*4201 that share Intron 1 sequence with B*0702, which is common over Western and Central Asia, and has a distribution indicating an early and long presence in Eurasian humans. A*48 appears to be the result of a recombination event that occurred early in the settlement history of Central Asia that then spread eastward into the NW Pacific rim and the New World. (For terminology help see: HLA-serotype tutorial)

== Serotype ==
B48 serotype recognition of Some HLA B*48 allele-group gene products
B*48	B48	Other	Sample
allele	%	%	size (N)
4801	78	10	610
4802	3	60	39
4803	66	13	32

== Alleles ==
HLA B*4801 frequencies
		freq
ref.	Population	(%)
	Ami (Taiwan)	26.0
	Lama (Lamas, Peru)	24.7
	Chiriguanos (Argentina)	21.7
	Truku (Taiwan)	19.1
	Atayal (Taiwan)	17.0
	Pima (Arizona, USA)	16.9
	Nenets (Russia)	15.7
	Yup'ik (Alaska, USA)	14.7
	Toba Rosario (Argentina)	13.4
	Puyuma (Taiwan)	12.0
	Nivkh (Sakhalin, Russia)	11.3
	Samoans (Samoa)	10.0
	Canoncito Navajo (New Mexico, USA)	9.8
	Tarahumara (Chihuahua, Mexico)	9.1
	Ivatan (Philippines)	8.0
	Ainu (Hokkaido, Japan)	7.0
	Rukai (Taiwan)	7.0
	Manchu (Harbin, China)	5.8
	Northern Han (China)	5.7
	Khalka (Mongolia)	5.7
	Pazeh (Taiwan)	5.5
	Beijing (China)	5.3
	Inner Mongolia (China)	4.9
	Siraya (Taiwan)	4.9
	Tuvans (Russia)	4.7
	N. Korean (Harbin, China)	4.5
	Maya (Mexico)	4.5
	Zapotec (Oaxaca, Mexico)	4.5
	Japan (5)	4.3
	Tibet (China)	4.1
	Tao (Taiwan)	4.0
	Dzungar (Mongolia)	3.9
	South Korea (3)	3.4
	Linqu County (Shandong, China)	3.3
	Seri (Sonora, Mexico)	3.0
	Wanigela (Papua New Guinea)	2.3
	Lakota Sioux (South Dakota, USA)	2.2
	Madang (Madang, Papua New Guinea)	1.8
	Kurds (Georgia Tbilisi)	1.7
	Southern Han (China)	1.6
	Rabaul (N. Britain, PNG)	1.3
	Thailand	1.1
	North Hindus (India)	1.0
	Saomi (Murmansk, Russia)	1.0
	Sindhi (Pakistan)	0.5

== Haplotypes ==
There is a known haplotype that covers a distance from South America to Siberia

A*2402 : C*08 : B*4801 : DRB1*08 : DQA1*0401 : DQB1*0402

and maybe indicative of recent long range migration. This haplotype is found in Peru, Mexico, Eskimos. The A*2402 : C*0801 : B*4801 sub-component is also found in Asian Americans, Hispanic Americans, Indigenous Taiwanese, Northern Philippines, Japanese, Orochon, Tibetans. The A-Cw-B component of the haplotype appears to have been conserved, however, equilibration of linkage to DR-DQ is more evident in Asian and Native American populations. The Cw*0803 allelic variant of this haplotype is found in Japan, Eskimos, Asian Americans, Hispanic Americans and Oaxacans. The oddity of the distribution is that, other than the Manchu of Northern China, the Chinese population is devoid of the major A24-B48 and A2-B48 haplotypes. This indicates gene-flow along the West Pacific Rim to the New World and across Siberia connecting Tibet and Japan. B48 is found higher in the Ainu and Nivkhi than Japanese.

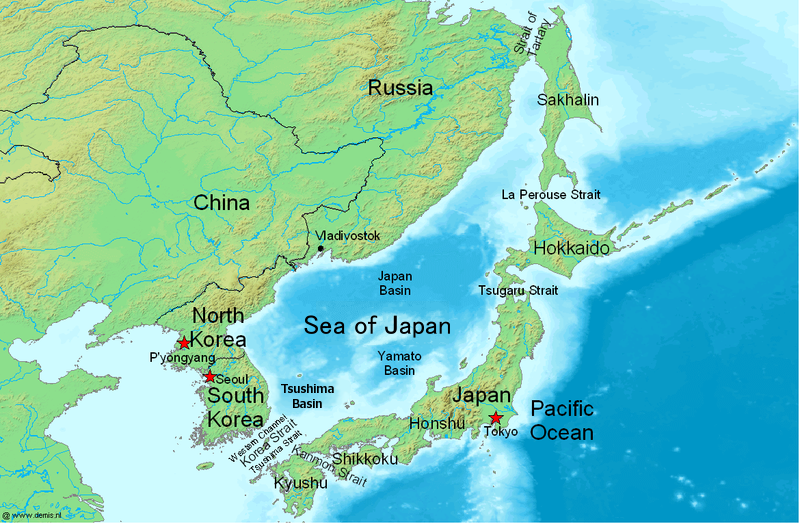
Sea of Japan

Another haplotype that shows long distance relationships is the A*0206 : C*0801 : B*4801 This haplotype is seen in the Taiwan aboriginal population, Okinawan, Japanese, Asian Americans, Orochon, Korean and Hispanic American populations. This haplotype might be extended with DRB1*0407 : DQA1*0301 : DQB1*0302

The Cw8-B48-DRB1*0407-DQB1*0302 is found in the Peru Llamas and Japanese populations. However levels in Japan, given the declining gradient to the south, indicate these haplotypes are the result of admixing with Northern Jomon populations during the post-Jomon period.

The B*48 haplotypes indicate that the Sea of Japan region was a probable hot spot for both migration to the South and also to the New World.

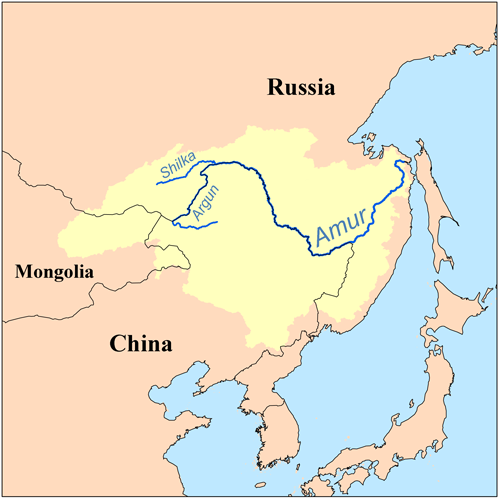
Sea of Japan

The Orochon, which have the highest level of A*24-B*48 live along the Amur river in NE China and share many similarities with the Ainu of Hokkaido and the Nivkhi of Northern Sakalin Island. HLA B*48 haplotypes indicate a means of passage to the New World along the Siberian Coast, a possible land route of passage through Beringia or later by boat across the bering strait into the New World.
