= HLA-B45 =

Human leukocyte antigen serotype

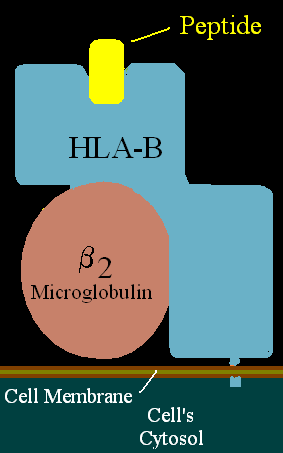
HLA-B (alpha)-β2MG with bound peptide
major histocompatibility complex (human), class I, B45
Alleles	B*4501, 4502 . .
Structure (See HLA-B)
Shared data
Locus	chr.6 6p21.31

HLA-B45 (B45) is an HLA-B serotype. The serotype identifies the B*45 gene-allele protein products of HLA-B.

B45 is a split antigen of the broad antigen B12, and is a sister type of B44. Gene products of 45 not 44

== Serotype ==
Serotypes B45, B12, and B44 recognition of the HLA B*44 gene products
B*45	B45	B12	B45	Sample
allele	%	%	%	size (N)
*4501	93	1	1	2307
*4502	75			4
Alleles link-out to IMGT/HLA Databease at EBI

== Alleles ==
It was reported that a novel haplotype was found in Italian bone marrow donors. A2-CW*1601-B45- DRB1*1101-DRB3*0301-DQA1*0102-DQB1*0502. This haplotype indicates possible very recent ancestry from Africa, with the Cw*1601 and B45 components and also with the DR11-DQ5.2 component both extremely rare in Europe.
