= BVL =

BVL may refer to

- Lima Stock Exchange (Bolsa de Valores de Lima)
- League of Free Liberals (Bond van Vrije Liberalen)
- Belarusian Extraleague (Belarusian Vysshaya Liga)
- BV Lüttringhausen, football club which merged with VfB Marathon Remscheid to form FC Remscheid
- German Federal Office of Consumer Protection and Food Safety (Bundesamt für Verbraucherschutz und Lebensmittelsicherheit)
- Buenaventura Lakes, Florida
