= B52 (medical treatment) =

Intramuscular injection

A B52 is an intramuscular injection containing three medications: diphenhydramine, haloperidol, and lorazepam. The B stands for Benadryl (a brand name for diphenhydramine), the 5 stands for 5 milligrams of haloperidol, and the 2 stands for 2 milligrams of lorazepam. This injection is used to treat agitation. Haloperidol is included because it blocks dopamine receptors, which may relieve agitation. Lorazepam is included because it enhances GABA inhibitory action to relieve anxiety and cause sedation. Diphenhydramine is included upon the rationale that it provides sedation and reduces the risk of extrapyramidal symptoms (EPS), such as dystonia, from haloperidol.

A 2021 review of B52 questioned the use of diphenhydramine in the cocktail given there was no evidence base found for its inclusion, whereas there was evidence for haloperidol and lorazepam. Evidence presented in a 2022 retrospective cohort study is used to argue against diphenhydramine's inclusion, based on a low risk of EPS and an association with longer stays in the emergency room. The diphenhydramine component of B52 is also associated with lower oxygen levels and the use of physical restraints.

== See also ==
- Droperidol
- Midazolam
- Olanzapine
