= HLA-B55 =

Human leukocyte antigen serotype

major histocompatibility complex (human), class I, B55
Alleles	B*5501, B*5502
Structure (See HLA-B)
Symbol(s)	HLA-B
EBI-HLA	B*5501
EBI-HLA	B*5502
Locus	chr.6 6p21.31

HLA-B55 (B55) is an HLA-B serotype. B55 is a split antigen from the B22 broad antigen, sister serotypes are B54 and B56. The serotype identifies the more common HLA-B*55 gene products. (For terminology help see: HLA-serotype tutorial)

== Serotype ==
B*55:03 is one of the four B alleles that reacts with neither Bw4 nor Bw6. The others are B*18:06, B*46:01, and B*73:01.

B55 and B22 serotype recognition of some HLA B*55 allele-group gene products
B*55	B55	B22	Sample
allele	%	%	size (N)
5501	92	5	453
5502	84	2	309

== Allele distribution ==
HLA B*5501 frequencies
		freq
ref.	Population	(%)
	India New Delhi	3.8
	Singapore Chinese Han	3.5
	Spain Eastern Andalusia Gipsy	3.5
	Georgia Tbilisi Kurds	3.4
	India North Delhi	3.3
	France South East	3.1
	Israel Arab Druse	3.0
	India North Hindus	2.9
	Georgia Tbilisi Georgians	2.8
	Russia Tuva (2)	2.8
	Georgia Svaneti Svans	2.5
	Iran Baloch	2.5
	Singapore Thai	2.5
	Sudanese	2.5
	Mexico Mestizos	2.4
	Spain Eastern Andalusia	2.4
	Ireland South	2.0
	Azores Central Islands	1.8
	Bulgaria	1.8
	Israel Ashkenazi and Non Ashkenazi Jews	1.8
	Oman	1.7
	Tunisia Tunis	1.7
	India Andhra Pradesh Golla	1.4
	China Tibet	1.3
	Uganda Kampala	1.2
	Finland	1.1
	Portugal North	1.1
	Portugal Centre	1.0
	Singapore Riau Malay	1.0
	B*5502
	Taiwan Taroko	14.5
	American Samoa	12.0
	China Guangxi Maonan	6.0
	Japan Ainu Hokkaido	5.0
	China Tibet Autonomous Region Tibetans	4.7
	Singapore Chinese	3.0
	China Beijing Shijiazhuang Tianjian Han	2.9
	China North Han	2.9
	South Korea (3)	2.7
	Hong Kong Chinese	2.2
	Japan (5)	2.2
	Taiwan Ami	2.0
	Thailand (3)	2.0
	New Caledonia	1.0
	Philippines Ivatan	1.0
