= REL-6B Radar =

Ground air surveillance and guidance radar

The REL－6B Radar is a ground-air surveillance and guidance radar which provides long range surveillance and guidance in air defense systems made in China.

It is manufactured and exported by the Nanjing Changjiang Machinery Group Co Ltd.

== Specifications ==
- Special 4 channels frequency divided and 2 channels polarize divided modes are adopted.
- High/low beams coverage antenna
- Use digital 3 pulses or 4 pulses MTI to suppress noise
- Output power element of transmitter is wideband frequency jumping magnetron.
- High reliability, easy to operate, reasonable cost.
- Two PPIs (raster scanning displayer, automatic extractor, automatic trace correlation)
