= HLA-B44 =

Human leukocyte antigen serotype

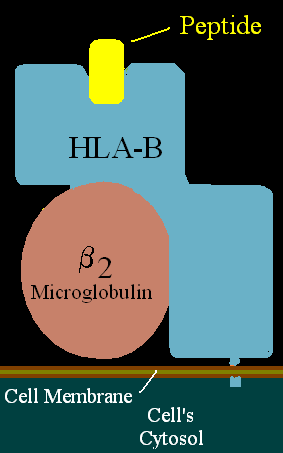
HLA-B (alpha)-β2MG with bound peptide
major histocompatibility complex (human), class I, B44
Alleles	B*4401, 4402, 4403 . .
Structure (See HLA-B)
Shared data
Locus	chr.6 6p21.31

HLA-B44 (B44) is an HLA-B serotype. The serotype identifies the B*44 gene-allele protein products of HLA-B.

B44 is a split antigen of the broad antigen B12, and is a sister type of B45.

== Serotype ==
Serotypes B44, B12, and B45 recognition of the HLA B*44 gene products
B*44	B44	B12	B45	Sample
allele	%	%	%	size (N)
*4402	98			6959
*4403	94			2854
*4404	65			42
*4405	92			130
*4406	44			9
B*4401 was shown to be B*4402 after errors corrected.
Alleles link-out to IMGT/HLA Database at EBI

== Disease ==
HLA-B44 increases recurrent sinopulmonary infections. Protective effects: HLA-B44 appears to be protective against autoimmune lymphoproliferative syndrome in patients with C95 defect (ALPS type Ia). B44 may be a cofactor in ankylosing spondylitis
