= HLA-B51 =

Serotype

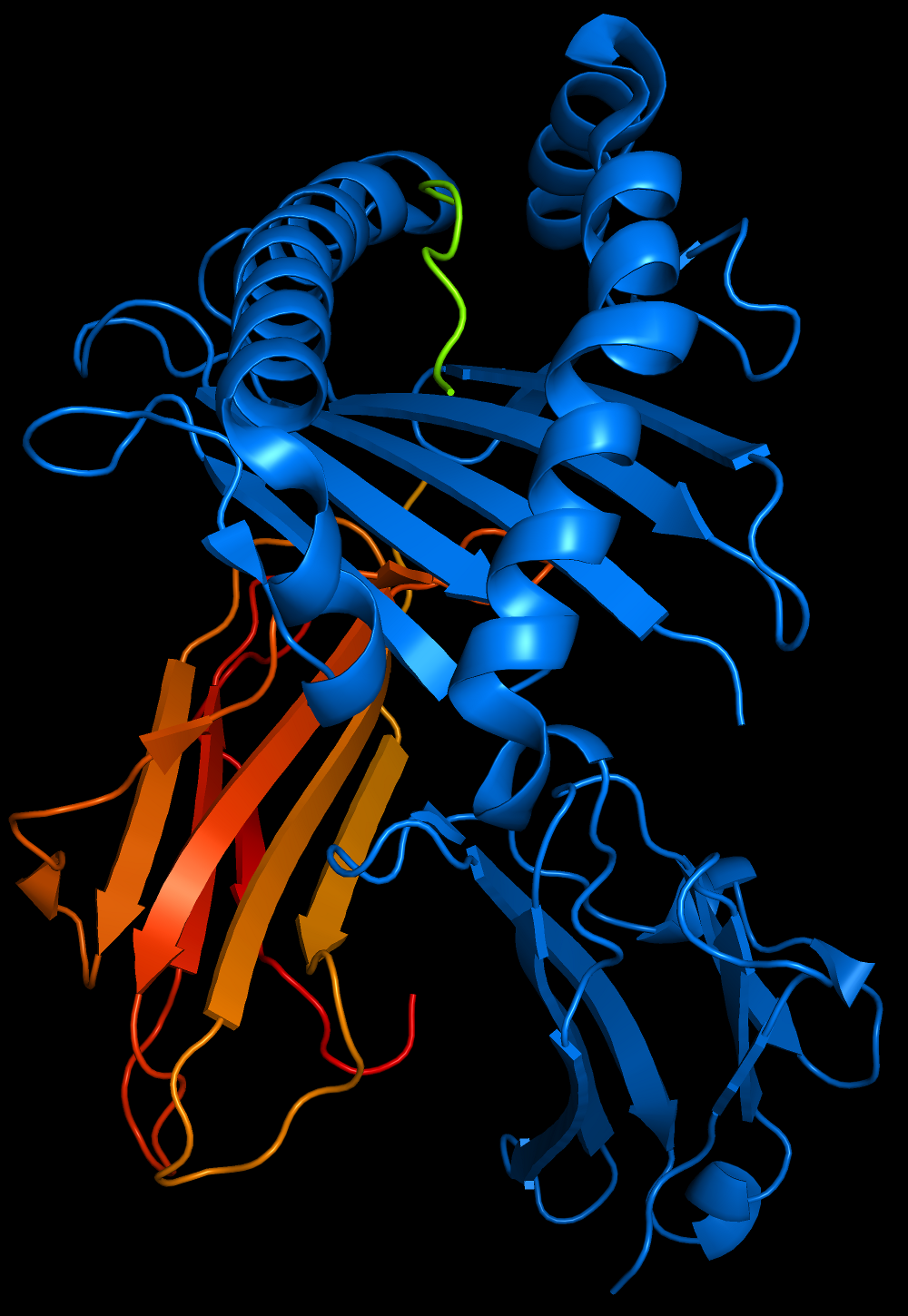
B*5101-β2M with bound peptide 1e28
major histocompatibility complex (human), class I, B51
Alleles	B*5101, 5102, 5103, . . .
Structure (See HLA-B)	Available; 3D structures
EBI-HLA	B*5101	1e28, 1e27

HLA-B51 (B51) is an HLA-B serotype. The serotype identifies the more common HLA-B*51 gene products.

B51 is a split antigen of the broad antigen B5, and is a sister serotype of B52. There are many alleles within the B*51 allele group. B51 is associated with several diseases, including Behçet's disease.

== Serotype ==
Serotypes B51, B5, B52, and B53 recognition of some HLA B*51 allele-group gene products
B*51	B51	B5	B52	B53	Sample
allele	%	%	%	%	size (N)
*5101	96	2	1		1899
*5102	73	3	6	11	218
*5104	83	17			6
*5105	48		16	24	25
*5106	64		7	12	42
*5107	78		9		68
*5108	77			3	154
*5109	86				43
B**5102 also reacts to B5102 - 3%, **5103 with B5103
Alleles link-out to IMGT/HLA Databease at EBI

== Alleles ==
There are 71 alleles, 57 amino acid sequence variants in B51 of which 4 are nulls. Of these only 9 are frequent enough to have been reliably serotyped. B*5101 is the most common, but others have a large regional abundance.

HLA B*5101 frequencies
		freq
ref.	Population	(%)
	Bulgaria	20.9
	Georgia Tbilisi Georgians	15.7
	India Tamil Nadu Nadar	15.6
	China North Han	14.8
	Georgia Tbilisi Kurds	12.1
	India Andhra Pradesh Golla	12.0
	China Qinghai Hui	11.4
	India New Delhi	9.8
	Madeira	9.7
	South Africa Natal Tamil	9.2
	USA Hawaii Okinawa	8.7
	Cape Verde Northwestern Islands	8.1
	Cape Verde Southeastern Islands	7.3
	India Mumbai Marathas	6.8
	Russia Tuva pop 2	6.1
	Israel Arab Druse	6.0
	China Inner Mongolia	5.9
	Czech Republic	5.7
	Finland	5.6
	Iran Baloch	8.1
	Brazil	5.1
	Mexico Guadalajara Mestizos	4.9
	New Mexico Canoncito Navajo	4.9
	China South Han	4.6
	India North Hindus	3.8
	Thailand	3.1
	Ivory Coast Akan Adiopodoume	2.3
	Singapore Chinese Han	2.3
	Singapore Javanese Indonesians	2.0
	Taiwan Saisiat	2.0
	Kenya	1.7
	Cameroon Yaounde	1.6
	Senegal Niokholo Mandenka	1.6
	Guinea Bissau	1.5
	USA Arizona Pima	1.1
	Venezuela Perja Mountain Bari	1.1
	Taiwan Pazeh	0.9
	China Guangdong Meizhou Han	0.5
	Israel Ashk. & Non Ashk. Jews	0.5
	Singapore Thai	3.0
	Iran Baloch	1.0
	USA Asian	1.0

== Disease associations ==
=== By serotype ===
Bw51 was associated with Behçet's disease, in endemic (versus epidemic) mucocutaneous lymph node syndrome, susceptibility to the virus that causes German measles infection.

HLA B*5102 frequencies
		freq
ref.	Population	(%)
	Mexico Sonora Seri	1.5
	Thailand	1.4
	Singapore Chinese	1.3
	Hong Kong Chinese	1.0
	USA Natives	0.8
	Mexico Zaptotec Oaxaca	0.7
	South Korea pop 3	0.6
	Shijiazhuang Tianjian Han	0.5
	China Guangxi Maonan	0.5
	Japan (5)	0.4
	USA Asian	0.4
	USA Hispanic	0.4
	USA African America	0.2

== In Behçet's disease ==
Behçet's disease is an inflammation of the wall of blood vessels that can involve the eyes, skin, and the rest of the body. Several alleles of B51 (B*5101, B*5108, B*5105, and B*5104) are found in disease, and linkage to markers, D6S285, in the HLA locus was strong (P<0.005). Homozygotes of B51 showed considerably high risk for disease indicating a possible gene-dose effect. B51 is capable of distinguishing several varieties of disease. HLA-B51 is found more frequently in disease that has an eye involvement. However it is less common in some regions when there is increased neurological involvement. The MICA*009 allele has been found to also associated with ABD when B51 is also present, IL-8 and other cytokines may also be involved. Sister chromatid exchange has also been observed more frequently in B51(+) ABD.

However, B51 tends not to be found in ABD when a certain SUMO4 gene variant is involved, and symptoms appear to be milder when HLA-B27 is present.
