= HLA-B56 =

Human leukocyte antigen serotype

major histocompatibility complex (human), class I, B56
Alleles	B*5601, *5602, *5603, *5604
Structure (See HLA-B)
Symbol(s)	HLA-B
EBI-HLA	B*5601
EBI-HLA	B*5602
EBI-HLA	B*5603
EBI-HLA	B*5604
Locus	chr.6 6p21.31

HLA-B56 (B56) is an HLA-B serotype. B56 is a split antigen from the B22 broad antigen, sister serotypes are B54 and B55. The serotype identifies the more common HLA-B*56 gene products. (For terminology help see: HLA-serotype tutorial)

== Serotype ==
B56 and B22 serotype recognition of Some HLA B*56 allele-group gene products
B*56	B56	B22	Sample
allele	%	%	size (N)
5601	72	5	671
5603	46	8	13
5604	73		11

== Allele distribution ==
HLA B*5601 frequencies
		freq
ref.	Population	(%)
	Australian Aborigine Kimberly	35.5
	Papua New Guinea Madang	34.6
	Papua New Guinea New Britain Rabaul	31.6
	Taiwan Ami	20.4
	New Caledonia	19.2
	Australian Aborigine Groote Eylandt	18.0
	Australian Aborigine Cape York Peninsula	16.5
	Australian Aborigine Yuendumu	11.4
	China Yunnan Lisu	9.4
	China Yunnan Nu	3.8
	Senegal Niokholo Mandenka	2.7
	Sudanese	2.5
	American Samoa	2.0
	China Guangxi Maonan	1.9
	Taiwan Hakka	1.8
	Thailand	1.8
	Finland	1.7
	Georgia Tbilisi Kurds	1.7
	India Andhra Pradesh Golla	1.4
	Croatia	1.3
	Japan (5)	1.3
	South Africa Natal Tamil	1.0
	Taiwan Rukai	1.0
