= HLA-A69 =

Human leukocyte antigen serotype

- (MHC Class I, A cell surface antigen)
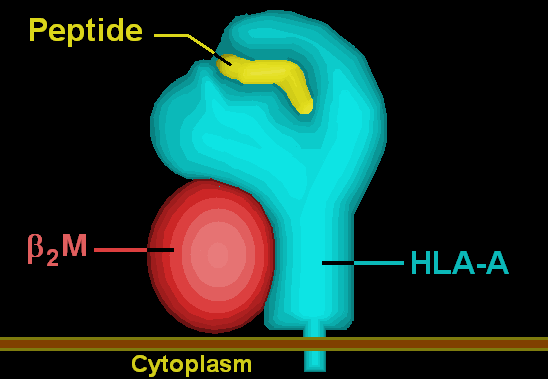
- HLA-A69

About
- Protein: transmembrane receptor/ligand
- Structure: αβ heterodimer
- Subunits: HLA-A*69--, β_{2}-microglobulin
- Older names: A28

Subtypes
Subtype	allele	Available structures
A69	*6901	
{{{cNick2}}}	*69{{{cAllele2}}}	
{{{cNick3}}}	*69{{{cAllele3}}}	
{{{cNick4}}}	*69{{{cAllele4}}}	
- Alleles link-out to IMGT/HLA database at EBI

HLA-A69 (A69) is a human leukocyte antigen serotype within HLA-A serotype group. The serotype is determined by the antibody recognition of α^{69} subset of HLA-A α-chains. For A69, the alpha "A" chain are encoded by the HLA-A*69 allele group and the β-chain are encoded by B2M locus. This group currently is dominated by A*6901. A69 and A*69 are almost synonymous in meaning. A69 is a split antigen of the broad antigen serotype A28. A69 is a sister serotype of A68.

A69 is more common in Levant. A69 (A*6901) is a derivative of the A*6801 allele that has undergone gene conversion with A*02. The recombination took place no more than 330,000 years ago.

== Serotype ==
A69 recognition of some HLA A*69 gene products
A*69	A69	A28	A68	A2	Sample
allele	%	%	%	%	size (N)
*6901	7	56	3	6	289

A69 is poor, with low specific detection, high non-specific identification by A28, and false recognition by A68 and A2.

== Distribution ==
HLA A*6901 frequencies
		freq
ref.	Population	(%)
	North Isl. (Cape Verde)	4.0
	Druse-Arab (Israel)	3.0
	South Isl. (Cape Verde)	2.4
	Mossi (Burkino Faso)	1.9
	Bulgaria	1.8
	Jew (Israel)	1.2
	Tunis (Tunisia)	1.1
	Bergamo (Italy)	1.1
	N. Delhi (India)	1.1
	Amman (Jordon)	1.0
	Sardinia (Italy)	1.0
	Central Portugal	1.0
	Shanghai (China)	0.7
	Girona (Catalon, Spain)	0.6
	Baloch (Iran)	0.6
	Greece	0.6
	Czech	0.5
	SE France	0.4
	Kampala (Uganda)	0.3
	N. Greece	0.3
	Romania	0.3
	Sudanese	0.25
	U. Arab Emerates	0.25
	Japan	0.0
	Croatia	0.0
	N. Ireland	0.0
	Zambia	0.0
	Luo (Kenya)	0.0
	Nandi (Kenya)	0.0
	Bandiagara (Mali)	0.0

Distribution of A69 places nodal center in the Levant, but high levels in West Africa. The model of human genetic origin places first migrations from Eastern Africa. However, in many east African populations the frequency of A69 is zero. A more consistent model of A69 distribution is either a subsequent migration from West Africa, supported by A36 and HLA DR3-DQ2. The higher levels in the Gaza Palestinians supports this hypothesis.

=== Disease associations ===
A69 may be associated with sarcoidosis.
