= HLA-A31 =

Human leukocyte antigen serotype

- (MHC Class I, A cell surface antigen)
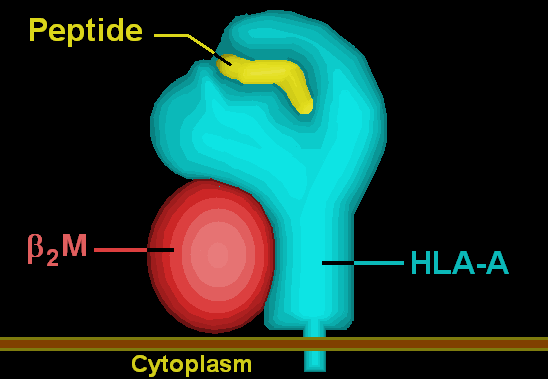
- HLA-A31

About
- Protein: transmembrane receptor/ligand
- Structure: αβ heterodimer
- Subunits: HLA-A*3101, β_{2}-microglobulin
- Older names: A19

Subtypes
Subtype	allele	Available structures
A31	*3101	
{{{cNick2}}}	*31{{{cAllele2}}}	
{{{cNick3}}}	*31{{{cAllele3}}}	
{{{cNick4}}}	*31{{{cAllele4}}}	

Rare alleles
Subtype	allele	Available structures
A31.2	*3102	
{{{rnick2}}}	*31{{{rallele2}}}	
{{{rnick3}}}	*31{{{rallele3}}}	
- Alleles link-out to IMGT/HLA database at EBI

HLA-A31 (A31) is a human leukocyte antigen serotype within HLA-A serotype group. The serotype is determined by the antibody recognition of α^{31} subset of HLA-A α-chains. For A31, the alpha "A" chain are encoded by the HLA-A*31 allele group and the β-chain are encoded by B2M locus. This group currently is dominated by A*3101. A31 and A*31 are almost synonymous in meaning. A31 is a split antigen of the broad antigen serotype A19. A31 is a sister serotype of A29, A30, A32, A33, and A74.

A31 is more common in South and Central America.

== Serotype ==
A31 recognition of some HLA A*31 gene products
A*31	A31	A19	A30	Sample
allele	%	%	%	size (N)
*3101	90	1	3	3517
*3102	100	0	0	11

There is substantive false reaction of A30 with A*3101, otherwise serological identification is good.

== Distribution ==
HLA A*3101 frequencies
- Study population: Freq. (in %)
- USA New Mexico Canoncito …: 26.8
- Argentina Chiriguanos: 26.4
- Argentina Salta Wichis: 23.7
- India Tamil Nadu Nadar: 18.9
- Mexico Michoacan Tarasco: 18.4
- Brazil Terena: 18.3
- USA South Dakota Lakota S…: 18.1
- Mexico Sonora Seri: 15.2
- Japan Hyogo: 14.1
- Colombia Mestizos: 13.3
- India Andhra Pradesh Goll…: 13.1
- Mexico Teenek Huasteca Re…: 12.1
- Japan Ainu Hokkaido: 12.0
- Guatemala Mayans: 10.9
- Brazil Parana Oriental: 10.6
- Mexico Chihuahua State Ta…: 10.2
- Peru Lamas City Lama: 10.2
- Russia Tuva (2): 9.8
- China Tibetan: 9.2
- Saudi Arabia Guraiat and …: 8.7
- India Kerala Hindu Ezhava: 8.3
- Mexico Guadalajara Mestiz…: 8.3
- Japan Okinawa Ryukyuan: 8.1
- USA North American Native…: 7.8
- Japan Aichi: 7.6
- USA Arizona Pima: 7.6
- Mongolia Buriat: 7.5
- China North Han: 7.1
- Japan Central: 7.1
- Mongolia Khalha: 7.0
- South Africa Natal Tamil: 7.0
- Mexico Zaptotec Oaxaca: 6.7
- Mongolia Khoton Tarialan: 6.5
- India Khandesh Pawra: 6.0
- Mongolia Oold: 5.8
- Saudi Arabia: 5.7
- China Inner Mongolia: 5.4
- South Korea: 5.4
- Papua New Guinea Madang: 5.1
- Finland: 5.0
- Chuvash: 4.9
- USA Hispanic: 4.9
- France South East: 4.7
- Sakhalin Island Nivkhi: 4.7
- Pakistan Sindhi: 4.4
- Belgium: 4.2
- Pakistan Kalash: 4.2
- Portugal South: 4.1
- Brazil: 4.0
- India Jalpaiguri Toto: 3.8
- Spain North Cabuernigo: 3.8
- Sweden Uppsala County: 3.8
- China Beijing: 3.7
- German Essen: 3.6
- Sri Lanka Colombo Sinhale…: 3.5
- Zambia Lusaka: 3.5
- Spain Catalonia Girona: 3.4
- Sweden Stockholm: 3.4
- Algeria1: 3.0
- Croatia: 3.0
- India New Delhi: 3.0
- Papua New Guinea Karimui …: 3.0
- Spain Basque Gipuzkoa Pro…: 3.0
- Sudanese: 3.0
- Wales: 3.0
- England Sheffield: 2.8
- China South Han: 2.8
- Czech Republic: 2.8
- Thailand: 2.8
- USA San Antonio Caucasian…: 2.7
- Italy Bergamo: 2.7
- Brazil Belo Horizonte: 2.6
- Ireland Northern: 2.6
- England Liverpool: 2.6
- China Yunnan Nu: 2.5
- Italy: 2.5
- Oman: 2.5
- Scotland Orkney: 2.5
- Uganda Kampala: 2.5
- England Newcastle: 2.4
- Mexico Mestizos: 2.4
- New Caledonia: 2.4
- Romanian: 2.3
- Iran Baloch: 2.2
- Ireland South: 2.2
- Morocco 'Berber' Nador Me…: 2.1
- Serbia: 2.1
- Burkina Faso Fulani: 2.0
- Georgia Svaneti Svans: 1.9
- Russia Northwest: 1.8
- Bulgaria: 1.8
- Georgia Tbilisi Kurds: 1.7
- Jordan Amman: 1.7
- Greece North: 1.6
- Tunisia: 1.5
- Thailand Northeast: 1.4
- Spain Basque Arratia Valley: 1.3
- USA African Americans: 1.3
- Israel Gaza Palestinians: 1.2

== Haplotypes ==
HLA A31 haplotype frequencies
		freq
ref.	Population	(%)
A31-B35^{(A*310102:Cw*0401:B*3501)}
	Lakota Sioux (USA)	4.1
	Indig American (USA)	3.7
	Mestizo (Guad. Mexico)	1.5
	Tibetan	1.1
	Jews (England)	1.3
	Tibetan	1.1
	Italian	0.6
	Japanese	0.5
	French	0.5
	Choushan (China)	0.4
	German	0.3
A31-B39^{(A*310102:Cw*0701:B*3901)}
	Mixtec (Oax. Mexico)	10.0
	Lakota Sioux (USA)	1.6
	Japanese	0.3
	German	0.1
A31-B48^{(A*310102:B*4801)}
	Orochon (Russia)	6.0
	Maya (Guatemala)	3.5
	Buriat	3.4
	Japanese	0.3
A31-B51^{(A*310102:B*5101)}
	Ainu (Hokkaido Japan)	8.9
	Indig. Brazil	5.8
	Orochon (Russia)	5.3
	Indig American (USA)	4.3
	Tibetan	3.3
	Inner Mongolian	3.0
	Japanese	3.0
	Portuguese	1.6
	Korean	1.2
	Italian	0.9
	French	0.5
	German	0.3
	Choushan (China)	0.2
^{(A*310102:B*5102)}
	Tarahumura (Mexico)	5.7
	Vietnamese	1.0
A31-B60^{(A*310102:Cw*0304:B*4001)}
	Lusaka (Zambia)	2.3
	Yakuts (Russia)	2.0
	Irish	0.7
	Choushan (China)	0.7
	Japan	0.6
	Dutch	0.6
	German	0.4
A31-B62^{(A*310102:B*1501)}
	Nivkhi (Sakalin, Russia)	12.5
	Yakut(Russia)	5.5
	Indig. Brazil	4.1
	Manchu	1.1
	Japan	0.4
	German	0.2
	Choushan (China)	0.2

Examination of A31 haplotypes reveals a probable connection across northern Eurasia during the prehistoric period. Frequencies of the more 'tale-tell' haplotypes (A31-B60, B61, and B62) fall from NE to SW Europe. Other haplotypes appears to have spread from the Middle East (A31-B51 and A31-B35).
