= HLA-A32 =

Human leukocyte antigen serotype

- (MHC Class I, A cell surface antigen)
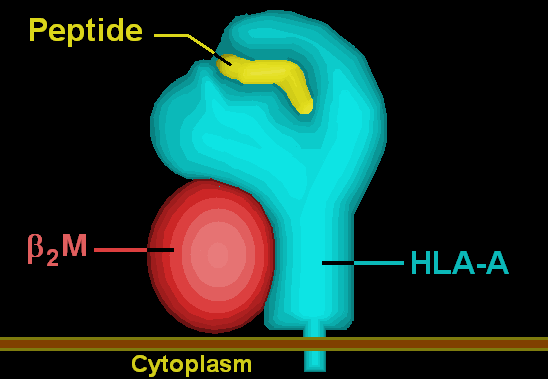
- HLA-A32

About
- Protein: transmembrane receptor/ligand
- Structure: αβ heterodimer
- Subunits: HLA-A*3201, β_{2}-microglobulin
- Older names: "A19"

Subtypes
Subtype	allele	Available structures
A19	*3201	
{{{cNick2}}}	*32{{{cAllele2}}}	
{{{cNick3}}}	*32{{{cAllele3}}}	
{{{cNick4}}}	*32{{{cAllele4}}}	
- Alleles link-out to IMGT/HLA database at EBI

HLA-A32 (A32) is a human leukocyte antigen serotype within HLA-A serotype group. The serotype is determined by the antibody recognition of α^{32} subset of HLA-A α-chains. For A32, the alpha "A" chain are encoded by the HLA-A*32 allele group and the β-chain are encoded by B2M locus. This group currently is dominated by A*3201. A32 and A*32 are almost synonymous in meaning. A32 is a split antigen of the broad antigen serotype A19. A32 is a sister serotype of A29, A30, A31, A33, and A74.

== Serotype ==
A32 recognition of some HLA A*32 gene products
A*32	A32	Sample
allele	%	size (N)
*3201	94	3441

A32 Serotyping efficiency for the predominant allele is good. There are 16 known alleles that result in 15 isoforms of HLA-A32. One isoform may be poorly expressed..

== Distribution ==
HLA A*3201 frequencies
- Study population: Freq. (in %)
- Oman: 11.4
- Pakistan Brahui: 9.2
- Italy Sardinia: 8.7
- Bulgaria: 8.2
- Burkina Faso Fulani: 8.2
- Pakistan Karachi Parsi: 7.8
- Pakistan Kalash: 7.5
- France South East: 7.2
- Pakistan Baloch: 7.1
- Greece North: 7.0
- Georgia Tbilisi Kurds: 6.7
- Iran Baloch: 6.7
- Spain North Cantabrian: 6.0
- Italy Bergamo: 5.9
- India North Hindus: 5.8
- Croatia: 5.7
- France Corsica: 5.5
- Scotland Orkney: 5.5
- Sudanese: 5.5
- Spain Eastern Andalusia: 5.4
- Algeria1: 5.1
- Azores Santa Maria and Sa…: 5.1
- Pakistan Pathan: 5.1
- Pakistan Sindhi: 5.1
- Romanian: 5.0
- Macedonia: 4.9
- Cape Verde Northwestern I…: 4.8
- Georgia Tbilisi Georgian…: 4.8
- Serbia: 4.6
- Ireland South: 4.4
- England Lancaster: 4.4
- Azores Terceira Island: 4.3
- USA Caucasian pop2: 4.3
- Bulgaria Gipsy: 4.2
- Cape Verde Southeastern I…: 4.0
- Israel Arab Druse: 4.0
- Portugal Centre: 4.0
- Burkina Faso Mossi: 3.8
- Guinea Bissau: 3.8
- Spain North Cabuernigo: 3.8
- Belgium: 3.7
- Russia Chuvash: 3.7
- Sweden Stockholm: 3.5
- Wales: 3.5
- England Sheffield: 3.5
- England Leeds: 3.4
- Australia New South Wales: 3.4
- Morocco Berber Nador Meta…: 3.4
- Ireland Northern: 3.2
- Jordan Amman: 3.1
- India Khandesh Pawra: 3.0
- India New Delhi: 3.0
- India West Coast Parsis: 3.0
- USA Hispanic: 3.0
- Turkey: 2.8
- Sweden Uppsala County: 2.7
- India North Delhi: 2.7
- Morocco: 2.7
- Pakistan Burusho: 2.7
- Kenya Luo: 2.6
- South African Natal Zulu: 2.5
- China North Han: 2.4
- Czech Republic: 2.4
- London Ashkenazi Jews: 2.4
- Mexico Mestizos: 2.4
- Saudi Arabia Guraiat and …: 2.4
- China Beijing: 2.2
- Finland: 2.2
- Uganda Kampala: 2.2
- Russia Tuva pop 2: 2.1
- USA North American Native…: 2.1
- Brazil: 2.0
- Cameroon Beti: 2.0
- Peru Arequipa: 2.0
- Russia Arkhangelsk Pomors: 2.0
- Italy North pop 1: 1.9
- Russia Northwest: 1.8
- German Essen: 1.8
- Spain Pas Valley: 1.6
- USA African America: 1.6
- Tunisia: 1.5
- Georgia Svaneti Svans: 1.3
- New Caledonia: 1.2
- South Africa Tswana: 1.2

A32 is most common around the Persian Gulf and the Mediterranean Basin. It has a consistent presence in Europe. The A32 frequencies in the more isolated (genetically) peoples of Europe suggests that the A32 rise in the Mediterranean may only be partially attributable to recent migrations from the middle eastern region. There is a node in southern Europe around the Ionian Sea in which specific, European, A32-haplotypes are elevated.

== Haplotypes ==
HLA A32 haplotype frequencies
		freq
ref.	Population	(%)
A32-B7^{(A*3201:B*0702)}
	Albanian	2.2
	Cuban	1.9
	Natal Zulu (S. Africa)	1.0
	Cretan	0.7
	Cretan	0.2
A32-B8^{(A*3201:B*0801)}
	N. Portugal	2.2
	Oman	1.8
A32-B14^{(A*3201:B*14)}
	!kung	1.9
	Tunis	1.8
	Natal Zulu (S. Africa)	1.0
	Portugal	1.1
	Irish	0.7
	Italian	0.6
A32-B27^{(A*3201:B27)}
	Gypsy(Spanish)	6.0
	E Black Sea (Turkey)	2.3
	German	0.3
A32-B35^{(A*3201:C*0401:B*3501)}
	Greek	3.5
	UA Emirates	2.8
	Sardinian	2.6
	Brahui (Pakistan)	2.5
	Tunisia	1.8
	Armenian	1.7
	Italian	1.5
	Oman	1.3
	Portugal	1.1
	German	0.3
A32-B61(40)^{(A*3201:B*40)}
	Tunis	1.2
	Greek	1.2
	French	0.6
	German	0.4
A32-B44^{(A*3201:B*4402)}
	Austrian	2.4
	Belgium	2.0
	Albanian	1.8
	S. Portugal	1.0
	Irish	0.7
	German	0.6
	Dutch	0.6
	Senegal	0.5
	Italian	0.4
A32-B51^{(A*3201:C*1201:B*5101)}
	Bulgarian	1.8
	German	0.3
^{(A*3201:C*1502:B*5101)}
	Oman	5.0
	Baloch (Pakistan)	3.2
	Kalash	2.9
	UA Emirates	1.9
	Baloch (Iran)	1.1
^{(A*3201:C*1401:B*5101)}
	Parsis (Karachi)	4.9
	Kalash	2.9

A common A32 haplotype A*3201-B*5101 can be found in Oman, United Arab Emirates, SE Iran, Bulgaria, and Portugal. A second, A*3201-B*3501 can be in the Omani, UAE, and Portugal.
