= HLA-A29 =

Human leukocyte antigen serotype

- (MHC Class I, A cell surface antigen)
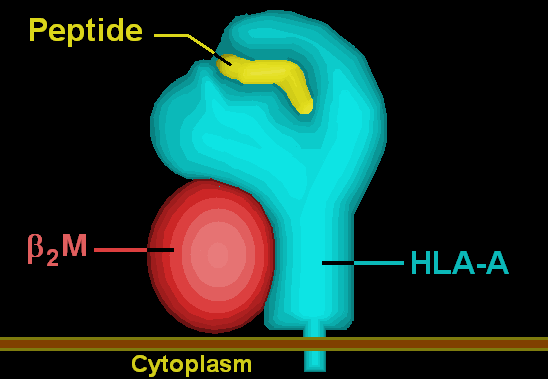
- HLA-A29

About
- Protein: transmembrane receptor/ligand
- Structure: αβ heterodimer
- Subunits: HLA-A*29--, β_{2}-microglobulin
- Older names: A19

Subtypes
Subtype	allele	Available structures
A29.1	*2901	
A29.2	*2902	
{{{cNick3}}}	*29{{{cAllele3}}}	
{{{cNick4}}}	*29{{{cAllele4}}}	
- Alleles link-out to IMGT/HLA database at EBI

HLA-A29 (A29) is a human leukocyte antigen serotype within HLA-A serotype group. The serotype is determined by the antibody recognition of α^{29} subset of HLA-A α-chains. For A29, the alpha "A" chain are encoded by the HLA-A*29 allele group and the β-chain are encoded by B2M locus. This group currently is dominated by A*2902. A29 and A*29 are almost synonymous in meaning. A29 is a split antigen of the broad antigen serotype A19. A29 is a sister serotype of A30, A31, A32, A33, and A74.

A29 is more common in Western Africa and Southwestern Europe.

== Serotype ==
A29 recognition of some HLA A*29 gene products
A*29	A29	Sample
allele	%	size (N)
*2901	96	119
*2902	99	1148

== Allele distribution ==
HLA A*2902 frequencies
- Study population: Freq. (in %)
- Spain Pas Valley: 13.5
- Spain Basque Gipuzkoa Pro…: 12.5
- South Africa Tswana: 12.2
- South African Natal Zulu: 11.0
- Cameroon Yaounde: 10.4
- Cameroon Pygmy Baka: 10.0
- Zimbabwe Harare Shona: 9.6
- Burkina Faso Fulani: 9.5
- Spain Catalonia Girona: 9.3
- Spain Ibizans: 9.3
- Tunisia Ghannouch: 9.1
- Saudi Arabia: 8.7
- Cameroon Bamileke: 8.4
- Cameroon Bakola Pygmy: 8.3
- Spain Murcia: 8.3
- Spain Menorca: 8.2
- Spain Basque Arratia Vall…: 8.0
- Cameroon Sawa: 7.7
- Spain North Cabuernigo: 7.7
- Tunisia: 7.2
- Portugal Centre: 7.0
- Spain Eastern Andalusia: 6.9
- Tunisia: 6.7
- Cameroon Beti: 6.3
- France Corsica: 6.0
- Scotland Orkney: 6.0
- Spain North Cantabrian: 6.0
- Zambia Lusaka: 5.8
- Kenya Luo: 5.3
- England Liverpool: 5.2
- France South East: 5.1
- Ireland Northern: 4.9
- Kenya: 4.9
- Tunisia Tunis: 4.9
- USA Hispanic: 4.9
- Kenya Nandi: 4.8
- Mongolia Hoton: 4.8
- Mongolia Khoton Tarialan: 4.8
- England Manchester: 4.8
- England Newcastle: 4.7
- Pakistan Karachi Parsi: 4.4
- USA Caucasian (2): 4.3
- Morocco 'berber' Nador Me…: 4.1
- Israeli Jews: 3.9
- England Lancaster: 3.8
- India Jalpaiguri Toto: 3.8
- Senegal Niokholo Mandenka: 3.8
- Belgium: 3.7
- Italy: 3.6
- Wales: 3.6
- Morocco: 3.4
- Mali Bandiagara: 3.3
- Ireland South: 3.2
- Uganda Kampala: 3.1
- Australia New South Wales: 3.0
- Brazil: 3.0
- Macedonia (4): 3.0
- China Yunnan Han (2): 2.9
- Greece (3): 2.9
- India North Delhi: 2.7
- Peru Arequipa: 2.7
- Taiwan Hakka: 2.7
- USA North American Native…: 2.7
- Italy South Campania: 2.6
- Italy Bergamo: 2.6
- Algeria1: 2.5
- India Kerala Hindu Nair: 2.4
- Israel Gaza Palestinians: 2.4
- Mexico Mestizos: 2.4
- Guatemala Mayans: 2.3
- German Essen: 2.0
- India West Coast Parsis: 2.0
- Israel Arab Druse: 2.0
- Romanian: 1.9
- Sudanese: 1.8
- Pakistan Brahui: 1.7
- Thailand Northeast: 1.6
- China Harbin Man: 1.5
- Guinea Bissau: 1.5
- Italy Sardinia pop3: 1.5
- Mexico Sonora Seri: 1.5
- Pakistan Pathan: 1.5
- Turkey: 1.3
- Czech Republic: 1.4
- Sweden Stockholm: 1.4
- Oman: 1.3
- Sweden Uppsala County: 1.2
- Russia Nenets: 1.2

HLA A*2901 frequencies
- Study population: Freq. (in %)
- Georgia Tbilisi Kurds: 6.7
- Mexico Guadalajara Mestiz…: 6.3
- CAR Mbenzele Pygmy: 5.7
- Israel Arab Druse: 4.5
- Pakistan Karachi Parsi: 4.4
- Iran Baloch: 2.8
- Taiwan Hakka: 2.7
- Kenya: 2.1
- Saudi Arabia Guraiat and …: 2.1
- India West Coast Parsis: 2.0
- India North Hindus: 1.9
- Jordan Amman: 1.7
- Pakistan Brahui: 1.7
- China Guangzhou: 1.5
- India New Delhi: 1.5
- Pakistan Pathan: 1.5
- Singapore Thai: 1.5
- South African Natal Zulu: 1.5
- Georgia Svaneti Svans: 1.3
- Kenya Nandi: 1.3
- USA Asian: 1.3
- China South Han: 1.2
- Finland: 1.1
- India North Delhi: 1.1
- Kenya Luo: 1.1
- China Inner Mongolia: 1.0
- Portugal Centre: 1.0
- South Korea (3): 1.0
- Pakistan Baloch: 0.8
- Croatia: 0.7
- Thailand: 0.7
- Ireland South: 0.6
- Romanian: 0.6
- Uganda Kampala: 0.6
- USA San Antonio Caucasian…: 0.6

== Haplotypes ==
For A29-Cw*16-B44 (A*2902:Cw*1601:B*4403) haplotype see Cw*16
