= HLA-A74 =

Human leukocyte antigen serotype

- (MHC Class I, A cell surface antigen)
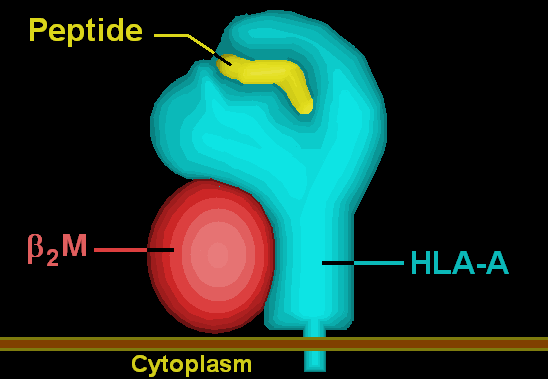
- HLA-A74

About
- Protein: transmembrane receptor/ligand
- Structure: αβ heterodimer
- Subunits: HLA-A*74--, β_{2}-microglobulin

Subtypes
| Subtype | allele | Available structures |
| A74 | *7401 | |
| {{{cNick2}}} | *74{{{cAllele2}}} | |
| {{{cNick3}}} | *74{{{cAllele3}}} | |
| {{{cNick4}}} | *74{{{cAllele4}}} | |

Rare alleles
| Subtype | allele | Available structures |
| A74.3 | *7403 | |
| {{{rnick2}}} | *74{{{rallele2}}} | |
| {{{rnick3}}} | *74{{{rallele3}}} | |
- Alleles link-out to IMGT/HLA database at EBI

HLA-A74 (A74) is a human leukocyte antigen serotype within HLA-A serotype group. The serotype is determined by the antibody recognition of α^{74} subset of HLA-A α-chains. For A74, the alpha "A" chain are encoded by the HLA-A*74 allele group and the β-chain are encoded by B2M locus. A74 and A*74 are almost synonymous in meaning. A74 is a split antigen of the broad antigen serotype A19. A74 is a sister serotype of A29, A30, A31, A32, and A33.

A74 is more common in Subsaharan Africa. A74 is a rare HLA-A allele group.

== Serotype ==
A74 recognition of some HLA A*74 gene products
| A*74 | A74 | A19 | Sample |
| allele | % | % | size (N) |
| *7401 | 40 | 11 | 119 |
| *7403 | 17 | 0 | 29 |

A74 has a poor serotyping rate.

== Disease associations ==
A significant association has been found between A74 and nasal polyposis.

== Allele distribution ==
HLA A*7401 frequencies
- Study population: Freq. (in %)
- Colombia African Black: 11.6
- Kenya: 9.4
- Cameroon Beti: 8.3
- Guinea Bissau: 7.7
- Kenya Luo: 7.2
- Burkina Faso Mossi: 6.6
- South African Natal Zulu: 6.5
- Cape Verde Southeastern I…: 5.6
- Uganda Kampala: 5.2
- Cameroon Yaounde: 5.0
- Cameroon Bamileke: 4.5
- USA African America: 4.0
- Cameroon Sawa: 3.8
- South Africa Tswana: 3.7
- Mali Bandiagara: 3.6
- Iran Baloch: 2.8
- Zimbabwe Harare Shona: 2.7
- Zambia Lusaka: 2.3
- Senegal Niokholo Mandenka: 2.2
- Burkina Faso Rimaibe: 2.1
- Tunisia Ghannouch: 1.8
- Kenya Nandi: 1.7
- Brazil Parana Mulatto: 1.6
- Brazil: 1.5
- Morocco Nador Metalsa Cla…: 1.4
- Thailand Northeast: 1.2
- Venezuela Colonia Tovar: 1.2
- Brazil Belo Horizonte: 1.1
- Thailand: 1.1
- Tunisia Tunis: 1.1
- Turkey (1): 1.1

HLA A*7403 frequencies
- Study population: Freq. (in %)
- Kenya Luo: 2.8
- Argentina Toba Rosario: 0.6
- Iran Baloch: 0.6
- Saudi Arabia Guraiat and …: 0.5
- Kenya: 0.3
- Madeira: 0.3
- Uganda Kampala: 0.3

== Sources ==
- Madrigal JA, Belich MP, Hildebrand WH, et al. (November 1992). "Distinctive HLA-A,B antigens of black populations formed by interallelic conversion" (PDF). J. Immunol. 149 (10): 3411–5. PMID 1431115.
