= HLA-A33 =

Human leukocyte antigen serotype

- (MHC Class I, A cell surface antigen)
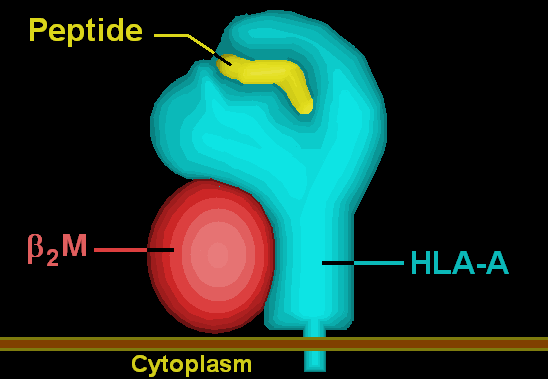
- HLA-A33

About
- Protein: transmembrane receptor/ligand
- Structure: αβ heterodimer
- Subunits: HLA-A*33--, β_{2}-microglobulin

Subtypes
Subtype	allele	Available structures
A33	*3301	
A33.3	*3303	
{{{cNick3}}}	*33{{{cAllele3}}}	
{{{cNick4}}}	*33{{{cAllele4}}}	
- Alleles link-out to IMGT/HLA database at EBI

HLA-A33 (A33) is a human leukocyte antigen serotype within HLA-A serotype group. The serotype is determined by the antibody recognition of α^{33} subset of HLA-A α-chains. For A33, the alpha "A" chain are encoded by the HLA-A*33 allele group and the β-chain are encoded by B2M locus. A33 and A*33 are almost synonymous in meaning. A33 is a split antigen of the broad antigen serotype A19. A33 is a sister serotype of A29, A30, A31, A32, and A74.

A33 is more common in Subsaharan Africa.

== Serotype ==
A33 recognition of some HLA A*33 gene products
A*33	A33	A19	Sample
allele	%	%	size (N)
*3301	87	3	687
*3303	95	0	807

A33 has a poor serotyping rate.

== A33 frequencies ==
HLA A*3301 frequencies
		freq
ref.	Population	(%)
	Pakistan Karachi Parsi	12.2
	Portugal North	7.6
	Tunisia	6.1
	Morocco Nador Metalsa	5.5
	Mongolia Buriat	4.6
	Guinea Bissau	4.6
	Jordan Amman	3.5
	Cape Verde NW Islands	3.2
	Portugal Centre	3.0
	Iran Baloch	2.8
	Pakistan Baloch	2.4
	France South East	2.3
	Sudanese	1.8
	Japan Okinawa Ryukyuan	1.8
	Mali Bandiagara	1.8
	Bulgaria	1.8
	Pakistan Kalash	1.7
	Uganda Kampala	1.5
	Georgia Svaneti	1.3
	Kenya Luo	1.3
	Oman	1.3
	Zambia Lusaka	1.2
	China Guangdong Meizhou	1.0
	Romanian	1.0
	Croatia	1.0
	China Qinghai Hui	0.9
	Czech Republic	0.9
	Kenya	0.7
	Ireland Northern	0.7
	Singapore Chinese	0.6
	Cameroon Bamileke	0.6
	India North Delhi	0.5
	Georgia Tbilisi	0.5
	Belgium	0.5
	Cameroon Beti	0.3
	Kenya Nandi	0.2

A33 shows two different distributions that can be discriminated by subtyping capability of SSP-PCR.

=== A*3301 distribution ===
The first distribution appears to have a Western distribution that introgresses into Europe as a result of the post-Neolithic periods. It is commonly found in linkage disequilibration within the A*3301-Cw*0802-B*1402 haplotype which can be extended to DRB1 and DQB1 in certain instances (see below). The source of its general expansion appears to be the Middle East or the Levant, as it is found in the Palestinian population. B14 splits into B64 (B*1401) and B65 (B*1402).

=== A*3303 distribution ===
HLA A*3303 frequencies
		freq
ref.	Population	(%)
	Cameroon Baka	25.0
	Cameroon Sawa	23.1
	India West Bhils	18.0
	Pakistan Burusho	17.9
	South Korea (3)	16.3
	India West Parsis	14.0
	Singapore Thai	13.3
	India Mumbai Marathas	13.0
	Japan	12.8
	Pakistan Baloch	12.7
	China South Han	11.5
	Singapore Riau Malay	10.9
	Singapore Chinese	10.1
	Hong Kong Chinese	10.0
	Chaoshan	9.8
	Mali Bandiagara	9.4
	China Inner Mongolia	9.3
	Singapore Chinese Han	9.3
	Singapore Javan	9.0
	India North Hindus	8.7
	Guinea Bissau	8.5
	Taiwan Minnan	8.3
	Taiwan Hakka	8.2
	Senegal Mandenka	8.1
	Pakistan Brahui	8.0
	Pakistan Sindhi	7.6
	Russia Tuvan	7.1
	Pakistan Pathan	7.1
	South Africa Natal Tamil	7.0
	Pakistan Karachi Parsi	6.7
	India Tamil Nadu Nadar	6.6
	Israel Jews	6.4
	India Andhra Pradesh Golla	6.3
	China North Han	6.2
	China Beijing Tianjian	6.2
	India New Delhi	6.1
	Pakistan Kalash	5.8
	Iran Baloch	5.6
	China Qinghai Hui	5.5
	China Guangzhou	5.4
	Cameroon Bamileke	4.5
	China Yunnan Nu	4.4
	China Guangxi Maonan	4.2
	China Guangdong Meizhou	4.0
	Cape Verde SW Islands	4.0
	Taiwan Pazeh	3.6
	Uganda Kampala	3.1
	China Beijing	3.0
	India Khandesh Pawra	3.0
	Cameroon Yaounde	2.8
	Sudanese	2.5
	Zimbabwe Harare Shona	2.4
	Cape Verde NW Islands	2.4
	Cameroon Beti	2.3
	Oman	2.1
	China Tibet	1.6
	Croatia	1.3
	Romanian	1.2
	China Yunnan Lisu	1.1
	Arab Druse	1.0
	Georgia Tbilisi	1.0
	Belgium	1.0
	Kenya Luo	0.9
	Lakota Sioux	0.5
	Australian Indig. Cape York	0.5
	Tunisia	0.5
	South African Natal Zulu	0.5
	Kenya	0.3
	Ireland Northern	0.3
	Kenya Nandi	0.2

The distribution of A*3303 varies across populations. It has been found at relatively low frequencies in samples of East Asian populations (Korean, 16.49; Javanese, 15.61%; Vietnamese, 11.5%). These frequencies increase in studies of populations from Western India, such as Maharashtra.

== A33 haplotypes ==
=== A33-Cw8-B14-DR1-DQ5 ===
HLA A*33-B14 frequencies
		freq
ref.	Population	(%)
	Parsis (Pakistan)	4.4
	Sardinian	3.0
	India West Coast Parsis	3.3
	Portuguese	2.7
	Armenian	2.5
	Indian	2.0
	Polish	2.0
	Ashkenazi Jews	1.8
	French	1.8
	Spanish	1.7
	Albanian	1.5
	German	1.5
	Tuscan	1.3
	Greek	1.1
	Marathans	1.1
	Italian	1.0

When dealing with haplotypes, if one assumes that linkage disequilibrium is random, then one can estimate the time of equilibration based on the size of the haplotype, the A-B-DR haplotype is over 2 million nucleotides in length. Given this length it is unlikely it spread during the Neolithic period. A more likely guess as to when it spread was the early historic period, with the spread of the Phoenician and Mycenaean culture throughout the mediterranean. Its presence in India, particularly northern India, indicates possible spread of this haplotype within the Black Sea region prior to the migration of Indo-Aryan culture across the Indus River. The specific nomenclature for this type is:

A*3301 : C*0802 : B*1402 : DRB1*0102 : DQA1*0102 : DQB1*0501

=== A33-B44 ===
HLA A*33-B44 frequencies
		freq
ref.	Population	(%)
	Iyers	9.6
	Korea	8.0
	Japan	6.1
	Thais	4.7
	Parsis (Pakistan)	4.4
	Bharghavas	4.0
	Java	3.7
	Tribals (India)	3.0
	Chinese (Thailand)	2.8
	Vietnamese	2.7

This haplotype appears to precede A33-B58 in Asia, bringing with it the DR7-DQ2 haplotype. There are two versions of the haplotype, possibly of different origins. It's a good reason why serotyping alone should not be relied upon. The first haplotype is A33-Cw14-B44-DR13-DQ6.4

A*3303 : C*1403 : B*4403 : DRB1*1302 : DQA1*0102 : DQB1*0604 : DPB1*0401

This haplotype is found in Japan and Korea, and it is the most common 5 locus HLA type in Korea, high at 4.2%, 25 times higher than in China. In Japan it is 4.8% and can be extended to DPB1 at 3.6%. While clearly not showing the level of disequilibrium of the Super B8 haplotype, the level of disequilibrium is high, indicating an expansive migration into these regions at some time in the recent past, most likely in the period preceding the Yayoi period of Japan.

A*3303 : C*0701 : B*4403 : DRB1*0701 : DQA1*0201? : DQB1*0202

The second haplotype, like A33-B58 is found in Korea but not in Japan. This haplotype carries the other common DQ2 haplotype, DQ2.2. The Cw*0701 is found in the A*33-B58 haplotype and is like the result of a recombination between A33-Cw7 and a different B44-DR7 haplotype. These haplotypes indicate that interpreting population relationships by allele or even by low resolution haplotype information is error-prone and suggests the need for high resolution multigene haplotype studies.

=== A33-Cw3-B58-DR3-DQ2 ===
HLA A*33-B58 frequencies
		freq
ref.	Population	(%)
	Chinese (Thailand)	12.6
	Baloch (Pakistan)	11.1
	Chaoshan (China)	8.1
	Chinese (Singapore)	5.5
	Burusho (Pakistan)	4.6
	Hui	4.0
	Mongolian	3.7
	Kalash (Pakistan)	3.6
	Korea	3.5
	Yaku	3.2
	Panthan (Pakistan)	3.0
	Tribals (India)	3.0
	Baloch (SE Iran)	2.9
	Brahui (Pakistan)	2.9
	Southern Han	2.8
	Thais	2.5
	Vietnamese	2.3
	Inner Mongolian	2.2
	Miao	2.1
	West African	2.1
	South African	1.9
	Oman	1.6
	Sindhi (Pakistan)	1.5
	Manchu	1.2
	Sudan	1.2
	Cameroon Yaounde	1.1

Within eastern Asia A*3303 is in linkage disequilibrium with on haplotype in particular, the specific genetic makeup is:

A*3303 : C*0302 : B*5801 : DRB1*0301 : DQA1*0501 : DQB1*0201

It is interesting that the Cw allele in the Pakistani population is the same as the allele in the east Asian population C*0302. 8.3 of 11.1% of the A33-B58 in the Baloch Pakistani can is linked to DR3 and presumably DQ2.5 (There are few exceptions outside of Africa). This extends a haplotype the forms a semicircle around the Indian subcontinent indicating a substantive and relatively recent genetic relationship. The Parsis of Pakistan lack A33-B58, as with groups to the far west of Pakistan. The A33-B58-DR3-DQ2 haplotype appears to have originated in whole from West Africa, with current possibilities for Sudan or Northern Ethiopia as points of exit from Africa and a migration by the Indian Ocean to the western side of the Indus River.

=== A33-Cw7-B58-DR13-DQ6 ===
Within eastern Asia A*3303 is in linkage disequilibrium with on haplotype in particular, the specific genetic makeup is:

A*3303 : C*0701 : B*5801 : DRB1*1302 : DQA1*0102 : DQB1*0609

This haplotype is composed of genes most frequent in parts of western Africa. This includes the A*3303, B*5801, DRB1*1302, and DQB1*0609. The DRB1*0609 haplotype in nodal in east/central Africa in the Ugandan, Rwanda, Congo, Cameroon whereas the allele is at low frequencies in Western Europe, and its distribution is also consistent with a migration from east Africa direct to the Lower Indus River.
