= HLA-A68 =

Human leukocyte antigen serotype

- (MHC Class I, A cell surface antigen)
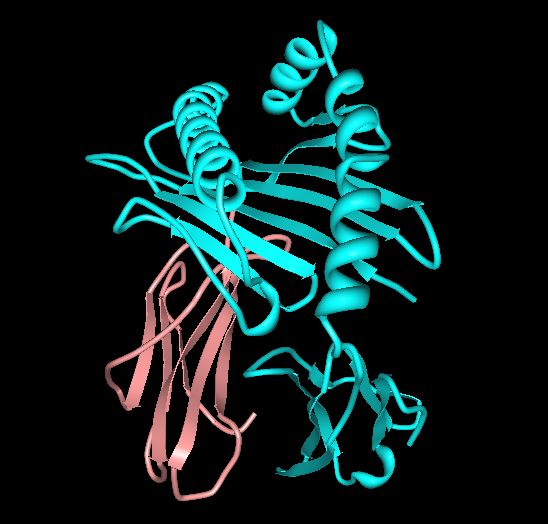
- Rendering or 2hla showing A*6801 (cyan) and Beta-2 microglobulin (rose). There is no bound peptide in this image.

About
- Protein: transmembrane receptor/ligand
- Structure: αβ heterodimer
- Subunits: HLA-A*68--, β_{2}-microglobulin
- Older names: A28

Subtypes
Subtype	allele	Available structures
Aw68.1	*6801	2hla, 1tmc, 1hsb
Aw68.2	*6802	
-	*6803	
{{{cNick4}}}	*68{{{cAllele4}}}	

Rare alleles
Subtype	allele	Available structures
-	*6805	
{{{rnick2}}}	*68{{{rallele2}}}	
{{{rnick3}}}	*68{{{rallele3}}}	
- Alleles link-out to IMGT/HLA database at EBI

HLA-A68 (A68) is a human leukocyte antigen serotype within HLA-A serotype group. The serotype is determined by the antibody recognition of α^{68} subset of HLA-A α-chains. For A68, the alpha "A" chain are encoded by the HLA-A*68 allele group and the β-chain are encoded by B2M locus. A68 and A*68 are almost synonymous in meaning. A68 is a split antigen of the broad antigen serotype A28. A68 is a sister serotype of A69.

A68 is more common in North America.

== Serotype ==
A68 recognition of some HLA A*68 gene products
A*68	A68	A28	A69	Sample
allele	%	%	%	size (N)
*6801	27	63	0	2736

A68 is poor, with low specific detection, high non-specific identification by A28.

== Disease associations ==
=== By allele ===
A*68 is associated with higher viral load in HIV. A68 may be protective against symptomatic heart disease in Chaga's cardiomyopathy.

== Allele frequencies ==
HLA A*6801 frequencies
- Study population: Freq. (in %)
- Brazil Terena: 25.0
- Mexico Sonora Seri: 19.7
- USA Alaska Yupik Natives: 15.5
- Mexico Mixtec Oaxaca: 13.7
- India Khandesh Pawra: 12.0
- Mexico Zapotec Oaxaca: 11.2
- Burkina Faso Mossi: 9.4
- Mexico Chihuahua State Ta…: 9.1
- Ecuador Cayapa: 9.0
- South Africa Natal Tamil: 8.0
- Pakistan Sindhi: 7.7
- India Mumbai Marathas: 7.5
- Pakistan Kalash: 7.5
- India Tamil Nadu Nadar: 7.4
- Senegal Niokolo Mandenka: 7.0
- Georgia Tbilisi Kurds: 6.7
- Georgia Svaneti Svans: 6.3
- Mexico Mestizos: 6.1
- India West Bhils: 6.0
- Portugal Centre: 6.0
- Belgium: 5.7
- Mexico Mixe Oaxaca: 5.6
- Saudi Arabia Gurayat and …: 5.6
- USA North American Native…: 5.6
- USA South Texas Hispanics: 5.2
- Cameroon Pygmy Baka: 5.0
- Cape Verde Northwestern I…: 4.8
- Georgia Tbilisi Georgian…: 4.8
- Croatia: 4.7
- Finland: 4.5
- Scotland Orkney: 4.4
- Oman: 4.3
- Morocco 'berber' Nador Me…: 4.2
- Australia New South Wales: 4.1
- USA African America: 4.0
- China Inner Mongolia: 3.9
- Guadalajara Mestizos (2): 3.9
- Cameroon Sawa: 3.8
- Mali Bandiagara: 3.6
- Tunisia: 3.5
- India Andhra Pradesh Goll…: 3.4
- Ireland South: 3.4
- Cameroon Beti: 3.2
- Pakistan Baloch: 3.2
- Burkina Faso Fulani: 3.1
- India West Coast Parsis: 3.0
- Israel Arab Druse: 3.0
- Japan Ainu Hokkaido: 3.0
- South African Natal Zulu: 3.0
- Sudanese: 3.0
- USA Caucasian: 3.0
- India North Hindus: 2.9
- Pakistan Brahui: 2.9
- Uganda Kampala: 2.8
- Iran Baloch: 2.7
- Ireland Northern: 2.7
- Romanian: 2.6
- USA Hispanic: 2.6
- Brazil: 2.5
- France South East: 2.4
- Guinea Bissau: 2.3
- Spain Catalonia Girona: 2.3
- China Beijing: 2.2
- France Corsica: 2.0
- Singapore Javanese Indonesia: 2.0
- USA South Dakota Lakota Sioux: 2.0
- Bulgaria: 1.8
- Mongolia Buryat: 1.7
- USA Arizona Pima: 1.7
- Spain Eastern Andalusia: 1.5
- Kenya: 1.4
- Cameroon Bamileke: 1.3
- Zimbabwe Harare Shona: 1.3
- Russia Tuva (2): 1.1

A68 can be subdivided into 3 alleles, *6801, *6802, *6803. *6801 can also be subdivided into *680101 and *680102 (previously called *68011 and *68012).

=== A*6801 ===
A*6801 is higher in certain Native American groups, South Asian peoples, African peoples, however *6801 is at low levels in most of SE Asia, particularly the indigenous populations. This is also reflected by low levels along the West Pacific Rim including Japan. The hiatus of *6801 breaks in Northern Japan with the 3% frequency found in the Ainu, which continues to increase with Arctic peoples and falls of in Native Americans. Whereas in the Western Eurasia's northern regions, A*6801 falls off. In both Africa and the New World both A*680101 and A*680102 can be found. Although in the New World A*680102 is more prevalent.

HLA A*6802 frequencies
		freq
ref.	Population	(%)
	Yucpa (Venezuela)	37.2
	Nandi (Kenya)	11.6
	Kenya	10.5
	Harare Shona (Zimbabwe)	9.8
	Natal Zulu (S. Africa)	9.5
	Luo (Kenya)	7.6
	Mali Bandiagara	6.2
	Sudanese	5.5
	Kampala (Uganda)	5.2
	Baka Pygmy (Cameroon)	5.0
	Mestizos (Guadalajara, Mexico)	4.9
	SEastern Isl (Cape Verde)	4.8
	Nador Metalsa (Morocco)	4.8
	Chiriguanos (Argentina)	4.7
	Mossi (Burkina Faso)	4.7
	Lusaka (Zambia)	4.7
	Bamileke (Cameroon)	4.5
	Sawa (Cameroon)	3.8
	Kalash (Pakistan)	3.3
	Beti (Cameroon)	3.2
	SE France	3.1
	Seri (Sonora, Mexico)	3.0
	Yaounde (Cameroon)	2.8
	Tunisia	2.5
	Guinea Bissau	2.3
	Fulani (Burkina Faso)	2.0
	S. Portugal	2.0
	Oman (E. Arabia)	1.7
	Corsica (France)	1.6
	Baloch (Pakistan)	1.6
	Niokholo Mandenka (Senegal)	1.6
	Eastern Andalusia (Spain)	1.5
	Orkney (Scotland)	1.4
	Mestizos (Mexico)	1.2
	Baloch(Iran)	1.1
	Bergamo (Italy)	1.1
	Northern Han (China)	1.0
	Central Portugal	1.0
	Czech Republic	0.9
	Northern Ireland	0.9
	Jews (Israel)	0.9
	Mixe (Oaxaca, Mexico)	0.9
	Madeira (Spain)	0.8
	Cayapa (Ecuador)	0.6
	Svans (Georgia)	0.6
	Majorca/Minorca (Spain)	0.6
	Belgium	0.5
	Lakota (Sioux)	0.5

=== A*6802 ===
A*6802 has a global node within certain native peoples of South America, at 37%. A secondary node can be found in Africa. Like *6801 there is an hiatus of *6802 in SE Asia's indigenous populations, indicating that this population is not a likely source within the native peoples of the New World. Levels are generally low (<1%) in Europe except along the Mediterranean coast. In Africa, higher levels can be found in Kenya and in Western Africa and the Cape Verde Islands. A note on purity, the notion that A*6802 is of indigeonous Native American origin can be challenged based on possibility of introgression from Europeans and Africans. In the case of the Yucpa this is not tenable. The Yucpa have an HLA-DQ8 frequency of ~80%, the highest DQ allele frequency in the world, this tribe shows little evidence of European genetic introgression, in addition the closest DQ8 frequency in terms of Africa are the isolated !Kung of Namibia. There are two possible sources of A*6802: Africa direct and Africa via Asia. The associated B alleles (B*48, B*61) point toward and Asian origin or an African source of very ancient origin, since time would be required to recombine Asian typical B alleles with A68. In the Spanish, A28 levels are 3.1% of this ~0.5% is A*6901, A*6802 is about 2.0% which means the net level of A*6802 to A*6805 in the Spanish is ~0.5%. Of 11 NA groups surveyed 9 are above and 2 are below 0.5%. Of the two Spanish groups 1 (Andalusia - 1.5%) is above and the other (Catalon 0.0%) is below. In an admixture model, Spanish introgression does not explain A*6802 in the New World. The Asian model of migration shows no single people NE of Pakistan that has A*6802.

=== A*6803 ===
HLA A*6803 frequencies
		freq
ref.	Population	(%)
	Mayan (Guatemala)	7.6
	Bakalo pygmy (Cameroon)	6.0
	Mestizo (Guadalajara, Mexico)	3.9
	Mestizo (Mexico)	3.7
	Mbenzele Pygmy (Central African)	1.5
	Lakota (Sioux)	1.2
	Yupik (Eskimo-Alaska)	1.0
	Buriat (Mongolia)	0.4
	N. Ireland, Romania, Czech,	0.0

A*6803 can be found in native peoples of the New World and in Central Asia, in Africa it appears to be limited to West and Central Africans. This distribution along with the information on 6801 and 6802 suggests a probable redistribution of *68 alleles from Africa after the initial migration from East Africa that colonized Southeast Asia. It also provides support for 2 waves of migration from Asia to the New World or, at minimum, an unknown mixing area of West Pacific Rim haplotypes and West African/Middle Eastern derived haplotypes in Eastern Asia before the first migration. At present the incursion of Western Eurasian peoples into East Asia follows evidence for reuse of transbaikal region after 18,300 years and correlates with the incipient Jōmon period of Japan several thousands of years later. Certain alleles and haplotypes of HLA in South Americans target Japan's estimated pre-Yayoi composition, but other peoples, for example in western Mexico are most similar to the Ainu and the peoples of the Amur basin.

=== A*6805 ===
A*6805 is found in the Guatemalan and Central African Mbenzele at low levels.

== A68 haplotypes ==
The genetic distance between Native Americans and Eurasians is too great for the persistence of shared haplotypes, particularly in light of the lower levels in most of Siberia. The link of haplotypes with Western Africa may be significant, and may indicate a rapid eastward migration and admixing within the late Paleolithic period.

=== Indigenous American haplotypes ===
A*680102-B35 haplotypes

- A*680102 Cw*0304 B*3506 (A68-Cw10-B35)
- A68-Cw4-B35 (Terena, Seri (Mexico))
  - A*680102 Cw*0401 B3521 (A68-Cw4-B35) (Terena)

A*6802-B35

- A*6802-B3501 Guadalajara
- A*6802-B3502 Guadalajara

A68-B35 Mayan (A*6803).

These two haplotypes are consistent with the presence of Cw4-B35 and A68 in Asia and Middle East and A68-B35 maybe the ancestral A68 haplotype. A28(A*6802)-B35 is found in Senegal.

A6801-B4002/4 - Terena, Eskimo, Mestizo, Tribal Indians (Asia)

A*680102-B*520102 in the Mexican Mestizo population. A28(A*6802)-B52 is also found in Senegal.

=== Old World A68 haplotypes ===
A28(~A68)-B51 Armenia, Senegal, Eskimo
A28(~A68)-B70 W. Afr, Zaire, Zimbabwe, N. and S. African (Non-caucasians), Khoi (Hottentot)
