= HLA-A*02 =

Human leukocyte antigen serotype within the HLA-A serotype group

HLA-A2
- (MHC Class I, A cell surface antigen)
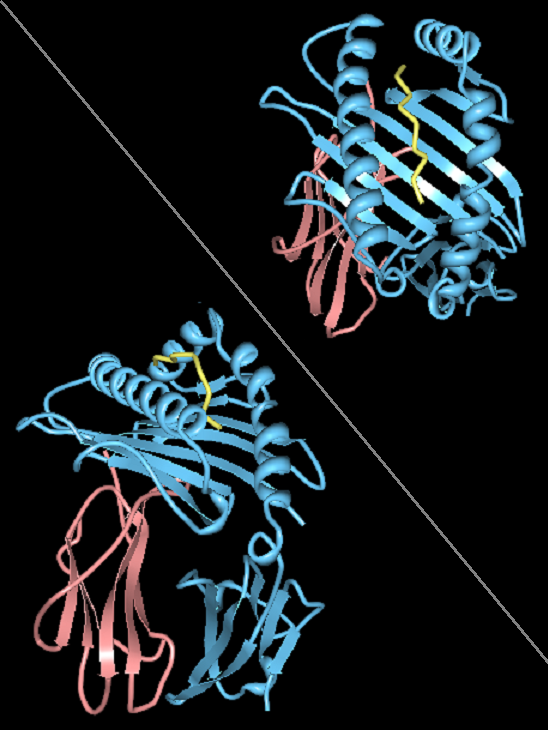
- Rendering of 2git: α (A*02:01 gene product), β_{2}-microglobulin, and HIV peptide.

About
- Protein: transmembrane receptor/ligand
- Structure: αβ heterodimer
- Subunits: HLA-A*02--, β_{2}-microglobulin
- Older names: HL-A2

Subtypes
Subtype	allele	Available structures
A2.1	*02:01	3hla, 2gj6, 2git, 2clr, 2bsv, 2c7u, 2bsu, 2av1, 2av7, 1tvb, 1tvh, 1s8d, 1s9w, 1s9x, 1s9y, 1t1w, 1t1x, 1t1y, 1t1z, 1t20, 1t21, 1t22, 1qse, 1qr1, 1qrn, 1p7q, 1jf1, 1jht, 1i1f, 1i1y, 1i4f, 1i7r, 1i7t, 1i7u, 1im3, 1akj, 1ao7, 1b0g, 1b0r, 1bd2, 1duy, 1duz, 1eey, 1eez, 1hhg, 1hhh, 1hhi, 1hhj, 1hhk, 1hla
A2.2F	*02:02	
A2.3, A203	*02:03	
A2.2Y	*02:05	
A2.4a	*02:06	

Rare alleles
Subtype	allele	Available structures
A2.4	*02:04	
A2.4b	*02:07	
A2.5	*02:11	
- Alleles link-out to IMGT/HLA database at EBI

HLA-A*02 (A*02) is a human leukocyte antigen serotype within the HLA-A serotype group. The serotype is determined by the antibody recognition of the α2 domain of the HLA-A α-chain. For A*02, the α chain is encoded by the HLA-A*02 gene and the β chain is encoded by the B2M locus. In 2010 the World Health Organization Naming Committee for Factors of the HLA System revised the nomenclature for HLAs. Before this revision, HLA-A*02 was also referred to as HLA-A2, HLA-A02, and HLA-A*2.

HLA-A*02 is one particular class I major histocompatibility complex (MHC) allele group at the HLA-A locus. The A*02 allele group can code for many proteins; as of December 2013 there are 456 different HLA-A*02 proteins. Serotyping can identify as far as HLA-A*02, which is typically enough to prevent transplant rejection (the original motivation for HLA identification). Genes can further be separated by genetic sequencing and analysis. HLAs can be identified with as many as nine numbers and a letter (ex. HLA-A*02:101:01:02N). HLA-A*02 is globally common, but particular variants of the allele can be separated by geographic prominence.

== Serotype ==
The serotyping for the most abundant A*02 alleles is good. For A*02:03, A*02:06, A*02:07 serotyping is borderline useful. There is a separate serotyping for A203 and A210. As of December 2013, there are 456 alleles identified (mostly by sequence homology) as being A2, of those 27 are nulls, and a large majority have unknown serotypes, although it is highly probable that they will all return A2 serotypes.

A2 recognition of some HLA A*02 gene products
A*02	A2	Sample
allele	%	size (N)
*02:01	98	6315
*02:02	81	859
*02:03	64	472
*02:05	81	462
*02:06	68	636
*02:07	80	135
*02:11	74	228

== Disease associations ==
HLAs serve as the primary link between the immune system and interior of cells. Thus any alteration to the HLA that induces decreased binding to a certain peptide or increased binding to a certain peptide, is expressed as, respectively, increased susceptibility to disease or decreased susceptibility to disease. In other words, certain HLAs may be incapable of binding any of the short peptides produced by proteolysis of pathogenic proteins. If HLAs bind none of the peptides produced by a pathogen, then there is no way for the immune system to tell that a cell is infected. Thus the infection can proliferate largely unchecked. It works the other way too. Some HLAs bind pathogenic peptide fragments with very high affinity. This in essence "supercharges" their immune system in regards to that particular pathogen, allowing them to easily control an infection that might otherwise be devastating.

=== Spontaneous abortion ===
The HLA-A*02 antigen has been associated with spontaneous abortion in infertile couples. In essence, there are indicators, albeit from a small study comparing HLA expression in fertile and infertile couples, that HLA-A*02 may induce increased maternal immune response to the fetus. This immune response could be compared to an allergic reaction, and, if severe enough, induces abortion of the fetus. Although this is a very interesting correlation, the study which first uncovered this link was quite small and more work needs to be done to verify this hypothesis.

=== Human immunodeficiency virus ===
HLA-A*02 appears to stimulate peripheral blood mononuclear cells in a manner that inhibits HIV replication. This could be the reason for a documented 9-fold reduced risk of HIV transmission to infants during childbirth. HIV has evolved mechanisms to combat immune recognition. HIV produces a protein called Nef that binds to the cytoplasmic tail of HLA-A and B and diverts it to the lysosomes for destruction. This prevents the HLAs from being expressed on the cell surface and then functioning properly. In addition, there are several HLA-A*02 haplotypes that appear to contribute heavily to higher or lower viral loads in HIV patients. HLA-A*02-C*16 and HLA-A*02-B*45 have been shown to contribute to significantly increased viral loads (greater than 100,000 copies per milliliter). In summation, HLA-A*02 appears to be somewhat less effective than other HLA-As at protecting against HIV infections.

=== Hodgkin lymphoma ===
HLA-A*02 has been linked with decreased risk of developing Epstein-Barr virus (EBV)-positive Hodgkin lymphoma(HL). Among patients with EBV+ HL, only 35.5% of people expressed HLA-A*02 compared to 50.9% in the EBV-HL group and 53% in the control group. This is a significant decrease and is almost certainly a result of the abnormally efficient binding of HLA-A*02 to peptides originating from EBV. This high affinity increases the probability of CD8+ t-cell recognition of EBV peptides held by HLA-A*02 complexes. This, in turn, enhances the immune system's ability to control and clear the EBV, which decreases the change of developing Hodgkin Lymphoma as a result of the infection.

==== By haplotype ====
A*02:Cw*16 is associated with increased higher viral load in HIV

== Alleles ==
A*02:01 allele frequency

HLA A*02:01 frequencies
- Study population: Freq. (in %)
- Mexico Sonora Seri: 54.5
- USA Arizona Pima: 43.6
- USA New Mexico Canoncito ...: 37.8
- Finland: 34.4
- Mexico Mestizos: 34.1
- Georgia Tbilisi Georgian...: 31.0
- Bulgaria: 30.0
- Philippines Ivatan: 30.0
- Spain Catalonia Girona: 29.9
- USA South Dakota Lakota S...: 29.7
- Portugal North: 29.3
- Italy North pop 1: 28.9
- Mexico Zaptotec Oaxaca: 28.4
- Italy Bergamo: 28.0
- Czech Republic: 27.4
- Ireland Northern: 27.4
- USA Caucasian (2): 27.2
- Spain Basque Gipuzkoa Pro...: 27.0
- Belgium: 26.6
- Croatia: 26.3
- Australia New South Wales: 26.1
- Portugal Centre: 26.0
- Turkey (1): 25.7
- Mexico Chihuahua State Ta...: 25.0
- Romanian: 25.0
- Ireland South: 24.6
- Mexico Guadalajara Mestizo: 22.3
- China Tibet: 21.8
- USA North American Native...: 21.7
- USA South Texas Hispanics: 21.7
- Oman: 21.6
- Venezuela Perja Mountain ...: 21.6
- Georgia Svaneti Svans: 21.3
- Brazil Terena: 20.8
- Iran Baloch: 20.2
- Japan Ainu Hokkaido: 20.0
- Brazil: 19.2
- China Beijing: 18.7
- Uganda Kampala: 18.4
- Morocco Nador Berber: 17.8
- Australia Indig. Cape Yor...: 17.5
- Tunisia: 17.5
- Sudanese: 17.3
- South Korea (3): 16.5
- Mongolia Buriat: 14.3
- Burkina Faso Rimaibe: 13.8
- Jordan Amman: 13.4
- Zambia Lusaka: 12.8
- USA African Americans (3): 12.1
- Japan (3): 11.6
- India Tamil Nadu Nadar: 10.7
- Japan Okinawa Ryukyuan: 10.2
- Zimbabwe Harare Shona: 9.1
- Ecuador Cayapa: 9.0
- Kenya: 8.7
- Georgia Tbilisi Kurds: 8.3
- Mali Bandiagara: 8.3
- Senegal Niokholo Mandenka: 8.1
- Cameroon Yaounde: 7.1
- Singapore Riau Malay: 6.5
- India North Hindus: 5.8
- Taiwan Hakka: 5.5
- Taiwan Pazeh: 5.5
- China South Han: 5.3
- Burkina Faso Fulani: 5.1
- Sri Lanka Colombo Sinhalese: 4.9
- China Guangxi Maonan: 4.6
- Singapore Javanese Indonesian: 4.0
- Taiwan Paiwan: 3.9
- India Andhra Pradesh Goll...: 3.4
- Singapore Thai: 3.1
- Taiwan Rukai: 3.0
- Taiwan Tsou: 2.9
- Pakistan Karachi Parsi: 2.8
- Taiwan Ami: 2.6
- South African Natal Zulu: 2.5
- New Caledonia: 2.4
- USA Alaska Yupik Natives: 2.4
- PNG Wanigela: 2.1
- Taiwan Puyuma: 2.0
- Taiwan Tao: 2.0
- India Mumbai Marathas: 1.9
- Thailand: 1.8
- South Africa Natal Tamil: 1.0

A*02:02 allele frequency

HLA A*02:02 frequencies
- Study population: Freq. (in %)
- Cameroon Bamileke: 10.4
- Senegal Niokholo Mandenka: 9.1
- Cameroon Yaounde: 8.2
- Mali Bandiagara: 7.6
- Guinea Bissau: 6.2
- Cameroon Beti: 6.0
- Burkina Faso Rimaibe: 5.3
- Kenya: 4.9
- Georgia Svaneti Svans: 3.8
- USA African Americans (2): 3.7
- Zimbabwe Harare Shona: 3.6
- South African Natal Zulu: 3.5
- Uganda Kampala: 3.4
- Saudi Arabia Guraiat and ...: 2.4
- Pakistan Brahui: 2.3
- Zambia Lusaka: 2.3
- Israel Arab Druse: 2.0
- Sudanese: 1.8
- India North Delhi: 1.7
- Pakistan Karachi Parsi: 1.7
- China Qinghai Hui: 1.4
- Portugal North: 1.1
- Georgia Tbilisi Georgian...: 1.0
- Tunisia: 1.0

A*02:03 allele frequency

HLA A*02:03 frequencies
- Study population: Freq. (in %)
- China Guangxi Maonan: 17.6
- China Yunnan Lisu: 15.2
- Thailand Northeast: 12.2
- China South Han: 10.8
- China Guangzhou: 9.8
- Singapore Javanese Indonesian: 9.0
- China Yunnan Nu: 8.2
- Thailand: 7.7
- Taiwan Minnan pop 1: 6.4
- Taiwan Puyuma: 6.0
- Taiwan Siraya: 5.9
- Singapore Riau Malay: 5.2
- India Khandesh Pawra: 5.0
- India West Bhils: 5.0
- Taiwan Pazeh: 4.5
- USA Asian: 4.2
- India Mumbai Marathas: 3.7
- Taiwan Hakka: 3.6
- China North Han: 2.4
- Sri Lanka Colombo Sinhalese: 2.4
- China Qinghai Hui: 2.3
- Burkina Faso Rimaibe: 1.1
- Taiwan Saisiat: 1.0

A*02:05 allele frequency

HLA A*02:05 frequencies
- Study population: Freq. (in %)
- Burkina Faso Fulani: 9.2
- Kenya Nandi: 8.7
- Sudanese: 6.5
- Saudi Arabia Guraiat and ...: 6.1
- Italy North (1): 5.8
- South African Natal Zulu: 5.5
- Cameroon Pygmy Baka: 5.0
- Georgia Tbilisi Kurds: 5.0
- Burkina Faso Rimaibe: 4.3
- Israel Arab Druse: 4.0
- Cameroon Sawa: 3.8
- Turkey (1): 3.5
- Mongolia Buriat: 3.2
- Zimbabwe Harare Shona: 3.1
- India New Delhi: 3.0
- USA African America: 3.0
- Bulgaria: 2.7
- Cameroon Bamileke: 2.6
- Kenya Luo: 2.6
- Pakistan Sindhi: 2.5
- Tunisia: 2.5
- Cuban Mulatto: 2.4
- Czech Republic: 2.4
- Spain Catalonia Girona: 2.3
- Cameroon Yaounde: 2.2
- Mali Bandiagara: 2.2
- Uganda Kampala: 2.2
- Italy Bergamo: 2.1
- Oman: 2.1
- USA African Americans (2): 1.7
- China North Han: 1.4
- Georgia Tbilisi Georgian...: 1.4
- Kenya: 1.4
- Ireland Northern: 1.2
- Cameroon Beti: 1.1
- India North Delhi: 1.1
- Senegal Niokholo Mandenka: 1.1
- USA Caucasians (3): 1.1
- India North Hindus: 1.0
- Mexico Mixtec Oaxaca: 1.0
- Portugal Centre: 1.0
- Spain Basque Gipuzkoa Pro...: 1.0

A*02:06 allele frequency

HLA A*02:06 frequencies
- Study population: Freq. (in %)
- Mexico Mixe Oaxaca: 34.9
- Mexico Zaptotec Oaxaca: 26.1
- Mexico Mixtec Oaxaca: 21.6
- Pakistan Kalash: 21.6
- Japan Ainu Hokkaido: 20.0
- Japan Okinawa Ryukyuan: 18.3
- USA Alaska Yupik Natives: 16.5
- USA Hawaii Okinawa: 14.3
- American Samoa: 13.0
- Mexico Chihuahua State Ta...: 12.5
- Taiwan Puyuma: 12.0
- USA South Dakota Lakota S...: 10.5
- Taiwan Atayal: 9.4
- Japan pop3: 8.7
- Japan pop5: 8.4
- India North Delhi: 7.7
- Japan Central: 7.7
- USA Arizona Pima: 7.6
- Taiwan Bunun: 7.4
- USA South Texas Hispanics: 7.3
- USA North American Native...: 7.2
- China North Han: 7.1
- South Korea pop 3: 7.1
- Russia Tuva pop 2: 6.9
- Mexico Mestizos: 6.1
- Pakistan Burusho: 6.0
- Taiwan Taroko: 5.5
- Singapore Chinese Han: 5.2
- USA Asian: 5.0
- USA New Mexico Canoncito ...: 4.9
- China Beijing: 4.8
- China Beijing Shijiazhuan...: 4.7
- Hong Kong Chinese: 4.7
- China Guangxi Maonan: 4.6
- Mongolia Buriat: 4.3
- China Guangzhou: 4.0
- Philippines Ivatan: 4.0
- Singapore Chinese: 4.0
- Taiwan Pazeh: 3.6
- China South Han: 3.5
- Taiwan Thao: 3.3
- Pakistan Sindhi: 3.2
- USA Hispanic: 3.2
- Pakistan Pathan: 3.1
- India New Delhi: 3.0
- Taiwan Rukai: 3.0
- India North Hindus: 2.9
- Taiwan Minnan pop 1: 2.9
- Taiwan Paiwan: 2.9
- India Andhra Pradesh Goll...: 2.8
- Taiwan Hakka: 2.7
- Papua New Guinea Eastern ...: 2.6
- Thailand: 2.5
- Sri Lanka Colombo Sinhalese: 2.4
- Pakistan Brahui: 2.3
- Papua New Guinea Wanigela: 2.1
- Singapore Javanese Indone...: 2.0
- Singapore Riau Malay: 2.0
- Singapore Thai: 2.0
- Taiwan Saisiat: 2.0
- Taiwan Siraya: 2.0
- Pakistan Baloch: 1.6
- Taiwan Ami: 1.5
- Zambia Lusaka: 1.2
- Iran Baloch: 1.1
- Pakistan Karachi Parsi: 1.1

A*02:07 allele frequency

HLA A*02:07 frequencies
- Study population: Freq. (in %)
- Thailand Northeast: 15.7
- China Guangxi Maonan: 13.4
- Hong Kong Chinese: 13.1
- Singapore Chinese: 13.1
- Singapore Thai: 12.2
- Singapore Chinese Han: 11.6
- Taiwan Minnan pop 1: 11.3
- Thailand: 10.9
- China South Han: 9.4
- China Guangzhou: 9.3
- China Yunnan Nu: 8.2
- Taiwan Hakka: 8.2
- Taiwan Siraya: 6.9
- China Beijing: 6.7
- USA Asian: 6.6
- Taiwan Pazeh: 6.4
- China North Han: 4.3
- China Qinghai Hui: 3.6
- Japan (3): 3.4
- South Korea (3): 3.0
- China Inner Mongolia: 2.5
- China Yunnan Lisu: 2.2
- Mongolia Buriat: 2.1
- Singapore Riau Malay: 2.0
- Taiwan Thao: 1.7
- China Tibet Autonomous Region: 1.6
- Russia Tuva pop 2: 1.6
- USA Hawaii Okinawa: 1.4
- Burkina Faso Fulani: 1.0
- Japan Ainu Hokkaido: 1.0
- Singapore Javanese Indonesian: 1.0

A*02:11 allele frequency

HLA A*0211 frequencies
- Study population: Freq. (in %)
- India Khandesh Pawra: 16.0
- South Africa Natal Tamil: 13.0
- India Andhra Pradesh Goll...: 9.7
- India Mumbai Marathas: 8.6
- Sri Lanka Colombo Sinhale...: 7.4
- India North Hindus: 6.7
- Ecuador Cayapa: 4.8
- India West Bhils: 4.0
- Pakistan Sindhi: 2.5
- Pakistan Brahui: 2.3
- Pakistan Pathan: 2.0
- Singapore Javanese Indonesian: 2.0
- India North Delhi: 1.7
- Pakistan Baloch: 1.6
- Singapore Riau Malay: 1.2
- Iran Baloch: 1.1
- Pakistan Burusho: 1.1

== A2-B haplotypes ==
A2-B7 (Node in Netherlands) A2-B5

- A2-B51
- A2-B52

A2-B8
A2-B13
A2-B14

- A2-B64
- A2-B65

A2-B15

- A2-B62
- A2-B63
- A2-B70,71,75,76
- A2-B46 (Node in Southern China, may be most abundant haplotype)

A2-B16

- A2-B44
- A2-B45

A2-B18
A2-B27
A2-B35
A2-B37 A2-B39 (Node in North American Amerinds)
A2-B40

- A2-B60
- A2-B61

A2-B46

=== A2-Cw5-B44 ===
HLA A2-B44 haplotype frequencies
		freq		Rank in
ref.	Population	(%)		Pop.
	Cornish	11.4	^{1}	1
	Ireland	9.2		2
	Northern Ireland	8.0	^{1}	2
	Sweden	7.2		2
	Swiss	6.9		2
	Polish	6.2		1
	Spanish	5.9		1
	Ukraine	5.9		1
	Dutch Netherlands	5.9		3
	Dane	4.8		1
	Czech	4.7		3
	Basque	4.7		3
	Greek	4.5		3
	Yugoslavian	4.4
	Hungarian	3.5
	British	2.6		4
	Romania	2.5
	Austria	2.4
^{1}Cw*0501 (Eur.)

A2-Cw5-B44 is the multi-serotype designation for the haplotype HLA-A*02:01~C*05:01~B*4402, the class I portion, of an ancestral haplotype (A2~B44~DR4~DQ8). The full haplotype is (for relative distances) see Human leukocyte antigens:

A*02:01 ~ C*05:01 ~ B*44:02 ~ DRB1*04:01 ~ DQA1*03:01 ~ DQB1*03:02

Another haplotype that is more common in Central Europe is the (A2-B44-DR7-DQ2)

A*02:01 ~ C*05:01 ~ B*44:02 ~ DRB1*07:01 ~ DQA1*02:01 ~ DQB1*02:02

Over northwestern Europe A2-B44 shows a single common ancestor which contributed the Cw5 allele to the haplotype. The haplotype appears to have been introduced early in European prehistoric period, frequencies of the haplotype generally correlate with A1-Cw7-B8 and A2-B7. The haplotype is considerably more equilibrated relative to A1-B8 and a possible reason is gene flow from iberia or the east with related haplotypes after initial migrations.
