= HLA-A30 =

Human leukocyte antigen serotype

- (MHC Class I, A cell surface antigen)
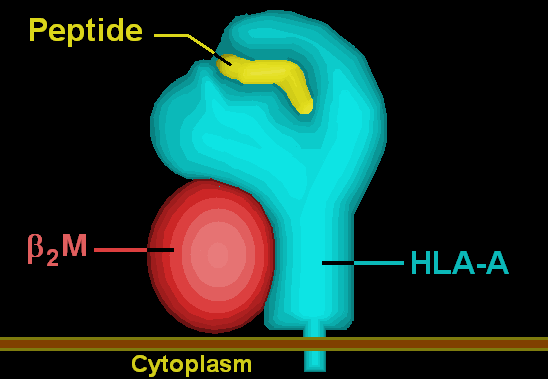
- HLA-A30

About
- Protein: transmembrane receptor/ligand
- Structure: αβ heterodimer
- Subunits: HLA-A*30--, β_{2}-microglobulin
- Older names: A19

Subtypes
Subtype	allele	Available structures
A30.3	*3001	
A30.2	*3002	
{{{cNick3}}}	*30{{{cAllele3}}}	
{{{cNick4}}}	*30{{{cAllele4}}}	

Rare alleles
Subtype	allele	Available structures
A30.4	*3004	
{{{rnick2}}}	*30{{{rallele2}}}	
{{{rnick3}}}	*30{{{rallele3}}}	
- Alleles link-out to IMGT/HLA database at EBI

HLA-A30 (A30) is a human leukocyte antigen serotype within HLA-A serotype group. The serotype is determined by the antibody recognition of α^{30} subset of HLA-A α-chains. For A30, the alpha "A" chain are encoded by the HLA-A*30 allele group and the β-chain are encoded by B2M locus. A30 and A*30 are almost synonymous in meaning. A30 is a split antigen of the broad antigen serotype A19. A30 is a sister serotype of A29, A31, A32, A33, and A74.

== Serotype ==
A30 recognition of some HLA A*30 gene products
A*30	A30	A19	A31	Sample
allele	%	%	%	size (N)
*3001	89	1	3	3517
*3002	93	1	2	2124
*3004	94	0	0	85

== Alleles ==
HLA A*3001 frequencies
- Study population: Freq. (in %)
- India West Coast Parsis: 16.0
- Mali Bandiagara: 14.1
- Zambia Lusaka: 14.0
- South African Natal Zulu: 9.5
- Jordan Amman: 9.3
- Pakistan Kalash: 9.2
- Zimbabwe Harare Shona: 9.1
- China Beijing: 9.0
- Kenya: 8.4
- Sudanese: 6.8
- Kenya Luo: 6.4
- India Khandesh Pawra: 6.0
- Pakistan Pathan: 5.6
- Cameroon Yaounde: 5.5
- USA African America: 5.0
- Kenya Nandi: 4.8
- Tunisia: 4.1
- Cameroon Beti: 4.0
- China Inner Mongolia: 3.9
- Cameroon Sawa: 3.8
- China North Han: 3.8
- Guinea Bissau: 3.8
- Senegal Niokholo Mandenka: 3.8
- South Korea (3): 3.5
- India North Delhi: 3.3
- Cameroon Bamileke: 3.2
- Pakistan Baloch: 3.2
- Uganda Kampala: 3.1
- Israel Arab Druse: 3.0
- China Qinghai Hui: 2.7
- USA Hispanic: 2.6
- Brazil: 2.5
- France South East: 2.3
- Iran Baloch: 2.2
- Saudi Arabia Guraiat and …: 2.1
- USA North American Native…: 2.1
- Portugal Centre: 2.0
- Romanian: 2.0
- Czech Republic: 1.9
- Taiwan Hakka: 1.8
- USA Asian: 1.8
- Brazil Terena: 1.7
- Georgia Tbilisi Kurds: 1.7
- USA Caucasians (3): 1.7
- China South Han: 1.6
- Morocco Nador Metalsa Cla…: 1.4
- Croatia: 1.3
- Macedonia (4): 1.2
- Mexico Mestizos: 1.2
- India Andhra Pradesh Goll…: 1.1
- Ireland Northern: 1.1
- Mexico Chihuahua State Ta…: 1.1
- Mongolia Buriat: 1.1
- Pakistan Brahui: 1.1
- Portugal North: 1.1
- Thailand: 1.1

HLA A*3002 frequencies
- Study population: Freq. (in %)
- Zambia Lusaka: 23.3
- Zimbabwe Harare Shona: 14.7
- Senegal Niokholo Mandenka: 12.4
- Cameroon Beti: 9.5
- Morocco 'Berber' Nador Me…: 8.9
- South African Natal Zulu: 8.5
- Cameroon Sawa: 7.7
- Cameroon Bamileke: 7.1
- Cameroon Yaounde: 6.0
- Kenya Luo: 5.9
- USA African Americans (3): 5.8
- Tunisia: 5.6
- Cameroon Pygmy Baka: 5.0
- Mexico Guadalajara Mestiz…: 4.9
- Oman: 4.2
- Pakistan Baloch: 4.0
- Uganda Kampala: 4.0
- Kenya Nandi: 3.7
- Mali Bandiagara: 3.4
- Pakistan Brahui: 3.4
- USA Hispanic: 3.4
- Guinea Bissau: 3.1
- USA South Texas Hispanics: 3.0
- Iran Baloch: 2.8
- Sudanese: 2.8
- Brazil: 2.5
- Portugal Centre: 2.0
- Saudi Arabia Guraiat and …: 1.9
- USA North American Native…: 1.9
- Georgia Tbilisi Kurds: 1.7
- Belgium: 1.6
- France South East: 1.2
- Ireland Northern: 1.2
- Macedonia: 1.2
- Pakistan Burusho: 1.1
- USA Caucasian Bethesda: 1.1

=== Disease association ===
A*3002 alters Type 1 diabetes risk
