= HLA-A3 =

Human leukocyte antigen serotype

- (MHC Class I, A cell surface antigen)
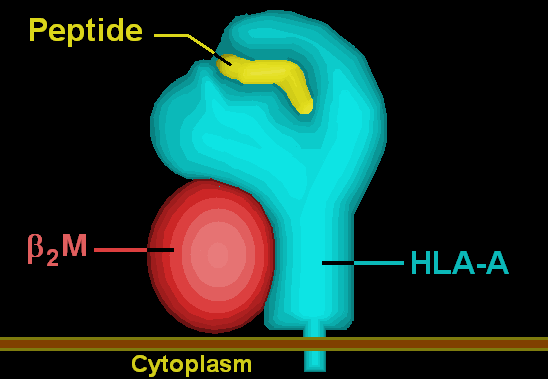
- HLA-A3

About
- Protein: transmembrane receptor/ligand
- Structure: αβ heterodimer
- Subunits: HLA-A*03--, β_{2}-microglobulin
- Older names: HL-A3

Subtypes
| Subtype | allele | Available structures |
| A3.1 | *03:01 | |
| A3.2 | *03:02 | |

Rare alleles
| Subtype | allele | Available structures |
| A3.5 | *03:05 | |
- Alleles link-out to IMGT/HLA database at EBI

HLA-A3 (A3) is a human leukocyte antigen serotype within HLA-A serotype group. The serotype is determined by the antibody recognition of α^{3} subset of HLA-A α-chains. For A3, the alpha, "A", chain are encoded by the HLA-A*03 allele group and the β-chain are encoded by B2M locus. This group currently is dominated by A*03:01. A3 and A*03 are almost synonymous in meaning. A3 is more common in Europe, it is part of the longest known multigene haplotype, A3~B7~DR15~DQ6.

== Serotype ==
A3 recognition of some HLA A*03 gene products
| A*03 | A3 | Sample |
| allele | % | size (N) |
| *03:01 | 99 | 3504 |
| *03:02 | 78 | 342 |
| *03:05 | 20 | 5 |

A3 is primarily composed of A*03:01 and *03:02 which serotype well with anti-A3 antibodies. There are 26 non-synonymous variants of A*03, 4 nulls, and 22 protein variants.

=== Associated diseases ===
A3 serotype is a secondary risk factor for myasthenia gravis and lower CD8^{+} levels in hemochromatosis patients. The HFE (Hemochromatosis) locus lies between A3 and B7 within the A3~DQ6 superhaplotype.

=== In HIV ===
HLA-A3 selects HIV evolution for a mutation Gag KK9 epitope and results in a rapid decline in the CD8 T-cell response. CD8 T-cells are responsible for quickly killing HIV infected CD4+ cells. This type of evolved response may not be specific for HLA-A3 and since HIV is capable of adapting quickly in situ to selective factors.

== Alleles ==
HLA A*03:01 frequencies
- Study population: Freq. (in %)
- Finland: 25.0
- India Tamil Nadu Nadar: 20.5
- Czech Republic: 18.9
- Belgium: 17.1
- Ireland Northern: 14.3
- Australia New South Wales: 13.8
- Georgia Svaneti Svans: 13.8
- Georgia Tbilisi Georgian…: 13.8
- Pakistan Burusho: 13.0
- Cape Verde Northwestern I…: 12.0
- Ireland South: 11.6
- Romanian: 11.6
- Croatia: 11.0
- USA Caucasians (3): 10.8
- Italy North (1): 9.7
- USA African Americans (2): 9.4
- India Mumbai Marathas: 9.3
- India West Bhils: 9.0
- Portugal Centre: 9.0
- Pakistan Pathan: 8.7
- Cameroon Beti: 8.6
- Cameroon Bamileke: 7.8
- Pakistan Kalash: 7.5
- Saudi Arabia Guraiat and …: 7.5
- USA Hispanic: 7.3
- India North Delhi: 7.2
- Madeira: 7.0
- Russia Tuva (2): 6.9
- Tunisia: 6.7
- USA North American Native…: 6.7
- Cape Verde Southeastern I…: 6.5
- Azores Santa Maria and Sa…: 6.4
- Pakistan Baloch: 6.3
- Guinea Bissau: 6.2
- Israel Arab Druse: 6.0
- South African Natal Zulu: 6.0
- USA South Texas Hispanics: 6.0
- India North Hindus: 5.8
- Zambia Lusaka: 5.8
- Iran Baloch: 5.6
- Uganda Kampala: 5.5
- Jordan Amman: 5.2
- Kenya: 5.2
- Brazil: 5.1
- Oman: 5.1
- Cameroon Pygmy Baka: 5.0
- Georgia Tbilisi Kurds: 5.0
- Sudanese: 4.8
- Bulgaria: 4.6
- Pakistan Brahui: 4.6
- China Beijing: 4.5
- Australia Indig. Cape Yor…: 4.4
- China Inner Mongolia: 4.4
- Mali Bandiagara: 4.4
- Pakistan Sindhi: 4.4
- China Qinghai Hui: 4.1
- Zimbabwe Harare Shona: 4.0
- Cameroon Sawa: 3.8
- Senegal Niokholo Mandenka: 3.8
- Kenya Luo: 3.6
- Morocco Nador Metalsa Cla…: 3.4
- Kenya Nandi: 3.1
- Mex. Guadalajara Mestizos…: 3.1
- China Guangzhou: 2.9
- China North Han: 2.9
- Mongolia Buriat: 2.9
- China Tibetans: 2.5
- China Yunnan Nu: 2.5
- Mexico Mestizos: 2.4
- American Samoa: 2.0
- Singapore Javanese Indone…: 2.0

HLA A*03:02 frequencies
- Study population: Freq. (in %)
- Georgia Tbilisi Kurds: 8.3
- Morocco Nador Metalsa Cla…: 4.1
- Pakistan Karachi Parsi: 2.8
- Israel Arab Druse: 2.5
- India New Delhi: 2.3
- Sudanese: 2.3
- India North Delhi: 2.2
- India West Coast Parsis: 2.0
- Portugal Centre: 2.0
- India Andhra Pradesh Goll…: 1.7
- Pakistan Kalash: 1.7
- Pakistan Baloch: 1.6
- Georgia Tbilisi Georgian…: 1.4
- Saudi Arabia Guraiat and …: 1.4
- Oman: 1.3
- Pakistan Sindhi: 1.3
- India North Hindus: 1.0
- Pakistan Pathan: 1.0
- South Africa Natal Tamil: 1.0
- USA South Texas Hispanics: 0.8

=== Associated diseases ===
A*03:01 modulates increased risk for multiple sclerosis

== A3~B haplotypes ==
A3-B7 is part of the A3~DQ2 superhaplotype A3-B8 (Romania, svanS)
A3~B35 (Bulgaria, Croatia, E. Black Sea)
A3~B55 (E. Black Sea)

=== A3~Cw7~B7 ===
A3~B7 is bimodal in frequency in Europe with one node in Ireland and the other in Switzerland, relatively speaking Switzerland appears to be higher. A3~Cw7~B7 is one of the most common multigene haplotypes in the western world, particularly in Central and Eastern Europe.

A*03:01 ~ C*07:02 ~ B*07:02 ~ DRB1*15:01 ~ DQA1*01:02 ~ DQB1*06:02
