= HLA-A19 =

Human leukocyte antigen serotype

HLA-A19 (A19) is a human leukocyte antigen HLA-A serotype that may recognize the A29, A30, A31, A32, A33, and A74 serotypes. While these haplotypes are found all over the globe, their combined frequencies are higher in Sub Saharan Africa; frequencies tend to decline away from Africa.

== Clinical significance ==
HLA-A19 has been implicated in a number of diseases, including renal cell carcinoma, Kaposi's sarcoma, vitiligo, and others; antibodies to HLA-A19 were recorded in 86% of infertile men and 92% of infertile women.

Subpages for A19 serotypes
Split antigen serotypes

of A19 HLA-A

HLA-A29
HLA-A30
HLA-A31
HLA-A32
HLA-A33
HLA-A74
