= HLA-A28 =

Human leukocyte antigen serotype

HLA-A28 (A28) is a broad antigen HLA-A serotype that recognized the A68 and A69 serotypes. These haplotypes are most common in the middle eastern region and NE Africa but can be found along central Asia to eastern siberia and within the New World.

Subpages for A28 serotypes
Split antigen serotypes

of A28 HLA-A

HLA-A68
HLA-A69
