= HLA-A11 =

Human leukocyte antigen serotype

- (MHC Class I, A cell surface antigen)
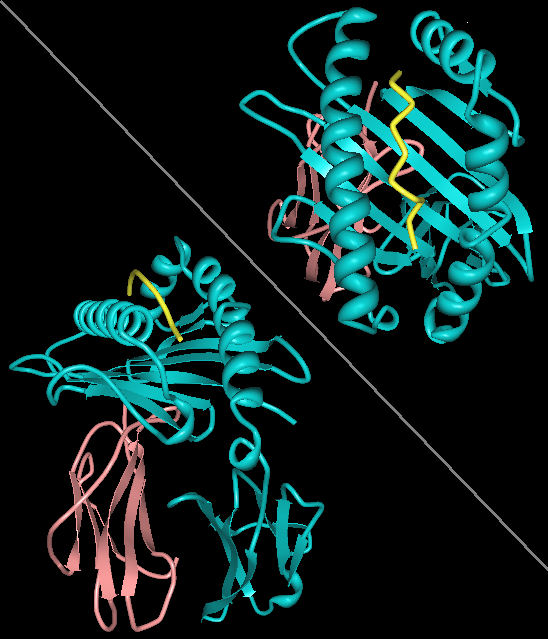
- Rendering of A11 (A*1101-B2M) in complex with HBV peptide homologue2HN7 HLA-A11 'alpha chain' (Cyan), β_{2}-microglobulin (Rose), HBV peptide (yellow).

About
- Protein: transmembrane receptor/ligand
- Structure: αβ heterodimer
- Subunits: HLA-A*11--, β_{2}-microglobulin
- Older names: HL-A11

Subtypes
Subtype	allele	Available structures
A11E, A11.1	*1101	2hn7, 1x7q, 1qvo, 1q94
A11K, A11.2	*1102	

Rare alleles
Subtype	allele	Available structures
A11.3	*1103	
A11.4	*1104	
- Alleles link-out to IMGT/HLA database at EBI

HLA-A11 (A11) is a human leukocyte antigen serotype within HLA-A "A" serotype group. The serotype is determined by the antibody recognition of α^{11} subset of HLA-A α-chains. For A11, the alpha "A" chain are encoded by the HLA-A*11 allele group and the β-chain are encoded by B2M locus. This group currently is dominated by A*1101. A11 and A*11 are almost synonymous in meaning. A11 is more common in East Asia than elsewhere, it is part of several long haplotypes that appear to have been frequent in the ancient peoples of Asia.

== Serotype ==
A11 recognition of some HLA A*11 gene products
A*11	A11	Sample
allele	%	size (N)
*1101	99	2530
*1102	76	42
*1103	83	18
*1104	60	6

Serotyping of A11 demonstrates better recognition of the *1101 gene products and poorer recognition of other A*11 gene products. There are ~40 recognized alleles of A*11. There is only one null classified as A11.

=== In infectious disease ===
Associations have been observed between A11 and familial otosclerosis, pulmonary tuberculosis, leprosy, and cytomegalovirus infection with epilepsy. These and other studies suggest an involvement between A11 and secondary effects of certain herpes virus infections. A11 was also found increase in supraglottic cancer with poor 3 year survival. In osteosarcoma A11 was found elevated.

There is a strong association between anti-depressant induced hepatitis and HLA-A11. In autoimmune hepatitis, A11 has a synergistic effect, acting together with DR4 and DR3 to increase the odds of disease to over 300.

A11 is also part of a haplotype A11-Cw4-B35-DR1-DQ1 that is a second factor in the rapid progression of HIV. The involvement of non-Hodgkin's lymphoma primarily as a result of Epstein-Barr virus reinfection does not appear to be a cause in this acceleration.

==== Epstein–Barr virus anomaly ====
There are at least a couple of forms of lymphoproliferative diseases that appear to arise from unresolved Epstein–Barr virus infection. Examination of the virus itself has led to the discovery of strains that can all but turn off the A11-mediated class I response to the virus in A11 enriched peoples (see tables below). This ability to turn off the immune system and for the virus to remain active is a factor in carcinogenesis. Early studies of A serotypes revealed and association of A11 with Hodgkin's lymphoma and recent studies have shown a complex involvement of Epstein-Barr virus infection as a consequence of low A11 control over infection.

Burkitt's lymphoma eventually lead to the discovery of the virus, however this disease is more evident in Africa. An involvement in cytotoxic T-lymphocytes down-regulation in Burkitt's lymphoma was subsequently discovered, More recent studies show A11 is down-regulated, and that other genetic defects are a likely cause. The ability to present EB virus antigens revealed a defect in the process after antigen process but before TAP1 involvement. Other studies indicated that peptides bind A11 in delivery to the cell surface for CTL screening, but fall off, and are destroyed intracellularly. However, A3 and A11 can process and load antigens even when proteosome activity is diminished suggesting an alternative mechanism for loading which may benefit in recovery from some disease but impair recovery of others.

It appears that these and other viruses have learned to exploit some defect in the region surrounding A11 that allows the near complete shut-down of gene expression. Oddly, in Africa A11 is at very low frequencies, and homozygotes are rare, suggesting that other genetic susceptibilities may exist that steer the virus toward Burkitt's lymphoma.

== Alleles ==
HLA A*1101 frequencies
- Study population: Freq. (in %)
- Papua New Guinea Madang: 63.6
- PNG West Schrader Ranges: 55.0
- Taiwan Hakka: 40.0
- PNG Wosera: 38.5
- ChinaYunnan Naxi: 38.0
- Taiwan Tao: 36.0
- China Guangxi Maonan: 35.2
- China Guangzhou: 33.8
- Taiwan Minnan (1): 30.9
- Thailand: 29.9
- China Wuhan: 29.3
- Taiwan Pazeh: 28.2
- China South Han: 27.7
- Thailand Northeast: 27.1
- Singapore Chinese: 26.5
- Taiwanese of Middle China…: 26.2
- PNG New Britain Rabaul: 26.0
- Pakistan Brahui: 25.2
- Australia Indig. Groote E…: 24.0
- India New Delhi: 23.5
- USA Asian: 23.0
- Pakistan Baloch: 22.2
- Taiwan Thao: 21.7
- China, Shandong, Linqu Co…: 20.4
- Pakistan Sindhi: 19.6
- Australia Indig. Cape Yor…: 18.0
- PNG Karimui Plateau: 17.9
- Singapore Riau Malay: 17.7
- Taiwan Siraya: 17.6
- China Beijing: 16.4
- Pakistan Pathan: 16.3
- China Inner Mongolia: 16.2
- American Samoa: 16.0
- Spain Basque Arratia Valley: 16.0
- China Qinghai Hui: 15.9
- Russia Murmansk Saomi: 14.0
- Singapore Javanese Indone…: 14.0
- New Caledonia: 13.1
- Japan Aichi: 12.7
- Georgia Svaneti Svans: 12.5
- India North Hindus: 12.5
- Pakistan Burusho: 12.5
- China Yunnan Han (2): 12.3
- India Mumbai Marathas: 12.3
- China Harbin N. Korean: 12.1
- India Andhra Pradesh Goll…: 11.9
- Taiwan Saisiat: 11.8
- Oman: 11.4
- Israel Arab Druse: 11.0
- South Korea (3): 10.8
- Taiwan Tsou: 10.8
- Mongolia Khoton Tarialan: 10.7
- Sri Lanka Colombo Sinhale…: 10.4
- Georgia Tbilisi Kurds: 10.0
- Mongolia Khalkha: 10.0
- Australia Indig. Kimberly: 9.7
- India North Delhi: 9.4
- Japan Hyogo: 9.4
- Spain North Cabuernigo: 8.9
- Saudi Arabia: 8.7
- Russia Tuva (2): 8.7
- Spain North Cantabrian: 8.4
- Japan Central: 8.2
- Romanian: 8.2
- Greece North: 8.0
- Ireland Northern: 8.0
- Taiwan Atayal: 8.0
- Jordan Amman: 7.9
- Italy North (1): 7.7
- Italy Sardinia (3): 7.7
- Australia Indig. Yuendumu: 7.6
- Mongolia Tsaatan: 7.6
- USA Caucasians (3): 7.4
- Bulgaria: 7.3
- Taiwan Taroko: 7.3
- Philippines Ivatan: 7.0
- USA Caucasian Bethesda: 7.0
- Portugal Centre (2): 6.8
- Australia New South Wales: 6.7
- Morocco: 6.7
- USA Hawaii Okinawa: 6.7
- Wales: 6.6
- Serbia: 6.5
- Georgia Tbilisi Georgian…: 6.2
- Ireland South: 6.2
- Algeria(1): 6.2
- Brazil: 6.1
- Spain Basque Gipuzkoa Pro…: 6.1
- Turkey (2): 6.1
- Russia Northwest: 6.0
- Portugal South pop2: 5.9
- England Newcastle: 5.7
- Italy North Pavia: 5.6
- Israeli Jews: 5.4
- Sweden Stockholm: 5.1
- Finland: 5.0
- Macedonia (4): 4.9
- Italy Bergamo: 4.8
- Morocco Berber Nador Meta…: 4.8

HLA A*1102 frequencies
- Study population: Freq. (in %)
- Taiwan Saisiat: 12.7
- Taiwan Pazeh: 10.9
- Taiwan Ami: 8.7
- Taiwan Puyuma: 7.0
- Taiwan Siraya: 6.9
- China Guangxi Maonan: 6.5
- Taiwan Atayal: 5.2
- Philippines Ivatan: 5.0
- Ch. Guangdong Meizhou Han: 4.6
- Taiwan Hakka: 4.5
- Hong Kong Chinese: 4.0
- Taiwan Minnan (1): 3.9
- Thailand: 3.5
- Singapore Chinese: 3.0
- Taiwan Tao: 3.0
- Taiwan Tsou: 2.9
- China Beijing Shijiazhuan…: 2.0
- Italy North pop 1: 1.9
- Taiwan Taroko: 1.8
- China Inner Mongolia: 1.0
- India West Coast Parsis: 1.0
- Taiwan Bunun: 1.0
- China Qinghai Hui: 0.9
- China Yunnan Lisu: 0.6
- Japan (3): 0.2

HLA A*1103 frequencies
- Study population: Freq. (in %)
- China Yunnan Lisu: 5.1
- China Yunnan Nu: 3.8
- China Beijing Shijiazhuan…: 0.2

HLA A*1104 frequencies
- Study population: Freq. (in %)
- Georgia Svaneti Svans: 1.3
- Singapore Riau Malay: 1.2
- American Samoa: 1.0
- India North Hindus: 1.0
- Israel Ashkenazi and Non …: 0.4
- China Beijing Shijiazhuan…: 0.2

=== Disease associations ===
A*1104 is associated with increased risk for cervical neoplasia resulting from human papillomavirus infection

== A11-B haplotypes ==
A11-B13

- A11-Cw2-B13 (Li)
- A11-Cw9-B13 (Southern China & SE Asia)
- A11-C10-B13 Buyi
- A11-CBL-B13 Northern China
