= Haemodialysis-associated amyloidosis =

- Specialty: Immunology

Haemodialysis-associated amyloidosis is a form of systemic amyloidosis associated with chronic kidney failure. Amyloidosis is the accumulation of misfolded protein fibers in the body that can be associated with many chronic illnesses. Even though amyloidosis is common in chronic kidney disease (CKD) patients receiving chronic regular dialysis, it has also been reported in a patient with chronic kidney failure but who never received dialysis.

== Presentation ==
Long-term haemodialysis results in a gradual accumulation of β_{2} microglobulin, a serum protein, in the blood. It accumulates because it is unable to cross the dialysis filter.

Affected individuals usually present after 5 years of dialysis rarely before that. The tendency of haemodialysis-associated amyloidosis is to be articular in general affecting the joints.

== Prevention ==
The mainstay of management of the dialysis related amyloidosis is the prevention than the other type of treatment methods. Because most of the medical and surgical managements for this condition may not prevent the symptoms completely. Therefore we have to take adequate precautions to prevent future dialysis disequilibrium syndrome in CKD patients.

There are several steps in prevention of dialysis related amyloidosis.

- Use of high flux dialyzers
- Use of Beta 2 globulin absorber
- Preserve the residual kidney functions
- Early kidney transplant

In addition low copper dialysis is theorized to prevent or delay onset.

== Management ==
Management of haemodialysis associated amyloidosis is symptomatic. Although there are lot of methods to prevent and delay the complications, probably the steroids and analgesics may helpful in the management of the condition.

However there are some surgical procedure to reduce the pain.

== See also ==
- Hepatoerythropoietic porphyria
- List of cutaneous conditions
