= HLA-Cw*16 =

major histocompatibility complex (human), class I, Cw*16
Alleles	Cw*1601; Cw*1602
Structure (See HLA-C)
Identifiers	1601 1602
Symbol(s)	HLA-C
EBI-HLA	Cw**1601
EBI-HLA	Cw**1602
Shared data
Locus	chr.6 6p21.31

HLA-Cw*16 (Cw*16) is an HLA-C allele-group. The serotype identifies the more common HLA-Cw*16 gene products. This allele group is most commonly found in West Africa, but A single Haplotype of Cw16 is found in Western Europe at unusually high frequencies. There is no useful serology for Cw*16.

== Alleles ==
HLA Cw*1601 frequencies
		freq
ref.	Population	(%)
	Bandiagara (Mali)	28.3
	Fulani (Burkina Faso)	21.4
	Mossi (Burkina Faso)	17.9
	Niokholo Mandinka (Senegal)	16.8
	Gipuzkoa Basque (Spain)	16.6
	Rimailbe (Burkina Faso)	16.0
	Ibizans (Spain)	11.4
	Bubi (Bioko, Eq, Guinea)	10.5
	Lusaka (Zambia)	10.0
	Girona (Catalonia, Spain)	9.8
	Kenya	8.4
	Shona (Harare, Zimbabwe)	8.0
	Tunisia	7.2
	Majorca and Minorca (Spain)	7.1
	Eastern Andalusia (Spain)	6.7
	Beti (Cameroon)	6.0
	Southeastern France	5.1
	E. Andalusia Gypsy (Spain)	5.1
	Northern Ireland	5.0
	Sudanese	5.0
	Kampala (Uganda)	4.9
	Bamileke (Cameroon)	4.5
	Luo (Kenya)	4.5
	Nandi (Kenya)	4.4
	Caucasians (UK)	4.1
	Sawa (Cameroon)	3.8
	Marathas (Mumbai, India)	3.7
	Central Portugal	3.7
	Corsica (France)	3.5
	Nador M. Berber (Morocco)	3.2
	Bergamo (Italy)	3.0
	Geneva (Switzerland)	2.7
	Tbilisi (Georgia)	1.9
	Kurds (Georgia)	1.7
	Mbenzele (C.African Rep.)	1.5
	Sindhi (Pakistan)	1.5
	Guraiat & Hail (Saudi Arabia)	1.2
	Baloch (Iran)	1.0
	Natal Tamil (South Africa)	1.0
	(Siraya) Taiwan	1.0
	Western France	0.5
	Lebanon	0.5
	Tehran (Iran)	0.4
	Turkey	0.4
	Amman (Jordan)	0.3
	Lakota Sioux (USA)	0.3
	Yupik Eskimo (USA)	0.2

=== Cw*1601 ===
Location of Mali

Location of Burkina-Faso

Location of Equatorial Guinea

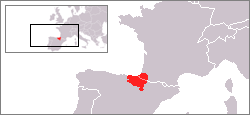
Location of BasqueCountry

While Cw*1601 probably did not evolve in Western Africa, it has certainly seen an expansion and it is a region in which most of the haplotype diversity is seen. As the frequency table for Cw*1601 reveals that highest frequencies for a given latitude north, more or less, follows the 0th meridian from Western Africa to the United Kingdom, the exception, an antinode, in Western France, indicating a displacement in those regions or the core of the Cw*16 bearing migration along the Eastern Region. There is a secondary node in the Basques of Spain, however given very little haplotype diversification (See A29-Cw*16-B44 haplotype, this page) indicates that this is the result of asymmetric expansion or selection within the Basque for the allele.
The Mandinka of Senegal are related to Bandiagara of Mali because the Malian Empire settled Senegal. The Bubi are found on the islands off the coast of Equatorial Guinea (Click on map to enlarge to full size to see islands)

Other alleles and haplotypes follow a similar pattern. The DR7-DQ2, DR3-DQ2 and A*2901 follow a similar pattern of apparent gene flow from Africa to Western Europe. Although for DR3-DQ2 the migration appears to be associated with B8 and probably occurred in the early AMH settlement of Europe.

== Haplotypes ==
=== A29-Cw*16-B44 ===
HLA Cw*16 haplotype frequencies
		freq
ref.	Population	(%)
A29-Cw16-B44^{(A*2902:Cw*1601:B*4403)}
	Basque, Gipuzkoa (Spain)	10.3
	Basque, San Sebastion (Spain)	7.5
	Pasiegos valley (Spain)	5.4
	Basque, Arratia (Spain)	5.3
	Cornish (Gr. Britain)	5.3
	Spanish	5.0
	Huate Corse (France)	4.3
	Paris (France)	3.9
	Portuguese	3.5
	French	3.4
	Irish	3.4
	S. African (Indig.)	2.7
	N. Irish	2.8
	Dane	2.2
	Tunisia	2.0
	Wales	2.0
	Tuscan	1.7
	Dutch	1.4
	German	1.3
	Rainforest (Cameroon)	1.3

A29-Cw16-B44(A*2902:Cw*1601:B*4403) appears to have originated in West Africa were Cw*16 frequency is highest and has undergone more linkage equilibrium. Cw*16 decline slowly heading north and more rapidly to the east and northeast, with the highest frequency/latitude north generally along Eastern Spain into the British Ilses, some flow up the channel but haplotype frequency drops in the interior of Europe.

This haplotype can generally be extended from A- to -DQ as A29-Cw16-B44-DR7-DQ2.2:

A*2901 : Cw*1601 : B*4403 : DRB1*0701 : DQA1*0201 : DQB1*0202

And, the Cw16 component is in strong linkage disequilibrium with the DR7-DQ2.2 component suggesting that since the haplotypes introduction into Europe there has not been adequate time for equilibration, supporting its recent introduction into Europe. This particular haplotype supports theories of migration that are more numerous than those supported by mtDNA or Y chromosomal information, many such 'smaller' migrations are evident with HLA haplotypes, suggesting a much greater complexity to human population than haploid loci make evident.
