= HLA-A =

Protein-coding gene in the species Homo sapiens

MHC class I, A
- (heterodimer)
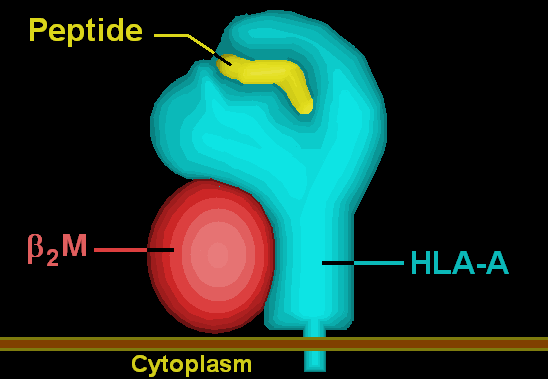
- Illustration of HLA-A
- Protein type: Transmembrane protein
- Function: Peptide presentation for immune recognition
Subunit name	Gene	Chromosomal locus
α	HLA-A	Chromosome 6p21.3
β_{2}M	B2M	Chromosome 15q22

HLA-A is a group of human leukocyte antigens (HLA) that are encoded by the HLA-A locus, which is located at human chromosome 6p21.3. HLA is a major histocompatibility complex (MHC) antigen specific to humans. HLA-A is one of three major types of human MHC class I transmembrane proteins. The others are HLA-B and HLA-C. The protein is a heterodimer, and is composed of a heavy α chain and smaller β chain. The α chain is encoded by a variant HLA-A gene, and the β chain (β_{2}-microglobulin) is an invariant β_{2} microglobulin molecule. The β_{2} microglobulin protein is encoded by the B2M gene, which is located at chromosome 15q21.1 in humans.

MHC Class I molecules such as HLA-A participate in a process that presents short polypeptides to the immune system. These polypeptides are typically 7–11 amino acids in length and originate from proteins being expressed by the cell. There are two classes of polypeptide that can be presented by an HLA protein: those that are supposed to be expressed by the cell (self) and those of foreign derivation (non-self). Under normal conditions cytotoxic T cells, which normally patrol the body in the blood, "read" the peptide presented by the complex. T cells, if functioning properly, only bind to non-self peptides. If binding occurs, a series of events is initiated culminating in cell death via apoptosis. In this manner, the human body eliminates any cells infected by a virus or expressing proteins they shouldn't be (e.g. cancerous cells).

For humans, as in most mammalian populations, MHC Class I molecules are extremely variable in their primary structure, and HLA-A is ranked among the genes with the fastest-evolving coding sequence in humans. As of March 2022, there are 7,452 known HLA-A alleles coding for 4,305 active proteins and 375 null proteins.This level of variation on MHC Class I is the primary cause of transplant rejection, as random transplantation between donor and host is unlikely to result in a matching of HLA-A, B or C antigens. Evolutionary biologists also believe that the wide variation in HLAs is a result of a balancing act between conflicting pathogenic pressures. Greater variety of HLAs decreases the probability that the entire population will be wiped out by a single pathogen as certain individuals will be highly resistant to each pathogen. The effect of HLA-A variation on HIV/AIDS progression is discussed below.

== HLA-A gene ==
HLA-A

Identifiers
- Aliases: HLA-A, Aw-33, Aw-74, major histocompatibility complex, class I, A, HLA-A11, HLA-A33, HLA-DQB1, HLA-DRB1
- External IDs: OMIM: 142800; MGI: 95931; GeneCards: HLA-A
Available structures
PDB	Human UniProt search: PDBe RCSB
PDB	List of PDB id codes 2XPG, 3RL1, 3RL2,%%s2BCK, 3I6L, 3NFN, 3QZW, 3VXM, 3VXN, 3VXO, 3VXP, 3VXR, 3VXS, 3VXU, 3W0W, 3WL9, 3WLB, 4F7M, 4F7P, 4F7T, 4WU5, 4WU7, 5HGA, 5HGD, 5HGB, 5HGH,%%s1Q94, 1QVO, 1X7Q, 2HN7, 4MJ5, 4MJ6, 4N8V, 4UQ2,%%s1W72, 3BO8, 4NQV, 4NQX, 5BRZ, 5BS0,%%s1AKJ, 1AO7, 1AQD, 1B0G, 1B0R, 1BD2, 1DUY, 1DUZ, 1EEY, 1EEZ, 1HHG, 1HHH, 1HHI, 1HHJ, 1HHK, 1HLA, 1I1F, 1I1Y, 1I4F, 1I7R, 1I7T, 1I7U, 1IM3, 1JF1, 1JHT, 1LP9, 1OGA, 1P7Q, 1QEW, 1QR1, 1QRN, 1QSE, 1QSF, 1S8D, 1S9W, 1S9X, 1S9Y, 1T1W, 1T1X, 1T1Y, 1T1Z, 1T20, 1T21, 1T22, 1TVB, 1TVH, 2AV1, 2AV7, 2BNQ, 2BNR, 2C7U, 2CLR, 2F53, 2F54, 2GIT, 2GJ6, 2GT9, 2GTW, 2GTZ, 2GUO, 2J8U, 2JCC, 2P5E, 2P5W, 2PYE, 2UWE, 2V2W, 2V2X, 2VLJ, 2VLK, 2VLL, 2VLR, 2X4N, 2X4O, 2X4P, 2X4Q, 2X4R, 2X4S, 2X4T, 2X4U, 2X70, 3BGM, 3BH8, 3BH9, 3BHB, 3D25, 3D39, 3D3V, 3FQN, 3FQR, 3FQT, 3FQU, 3FQW, 3FQX, 3FT2, 3FT3, 3FT4, 3GIV, 3GJF, 3GSN, 3GSO, 3GSQ, 3GSR, 3GSU, 3GSV, 3GSW, 3GSX, 3H7B, 3H9H, 3H9S, 3HAE, 3HLA, 3HPJ, 3I6G, 3I6K, 3IXA, 3KLA, 3MGO, 3MGT, 3MR9, 3MRB, 3MRC, 3MRD, 3MRF, 3MRG, 3MRH, 3MRI, 3MRJ, 3MRK, 3MRL, 3MRM, 3MRN, 3MRO, 3MRP, 3MRQ, 3MRR, 3MYJ, 3O3A, 3O3B, 3O3D, 3O3E, 3PWJ, 3PWL, 3PWN, 3PWP, 3QDG, 3QDJ, 3QDM, 3QEQ, 3QFD, 3QFJ, 3REW, 3TO2, 3UTQ, 3UTS, 3UTT, 3V5D, 3V5H, 3V5K, 4E5X, 4EMZ, 4EN2, 4EUP, 4FTV, 4GKN, 4GKS, 4I4W, 4JFD, 4JFE, 4JFF, 4JFO, 4JFP, 4JFQ, 4K7F, 4L29, 4L3C, 4L3E, 4MNQ, 4NNX, 4NNY, 4NO0, 4NO2, 4NO3, 4NO5, 4OV5, 4QOK, 4U6X, 4U6Y, 4UQ3, 4WJ5, 4WUU, 5EU3, 5EU5, 5EU4, 5D2L, 5D2N, 5EU6, 5HHQ, 5HHO, 5HHM, 5C09, 5C0F, 5E9D, 5C0G, 5C0A, 4ZEZ, 5C0I, 5D9S, 5HYJ, 5C0H, 5C0J, 5C0E, 5C0C, 5C0B, 5C07, 5C0D, 5C08, 5HHN,%%s1HSB, 1TMC, 2HLA, 4HWZ, 4HX1, 4I48

Gene location (Human)
Chr.	Chromosome 6 (human)
Band	6p22.1	Start	29,941,260 bp
Band	6p22.1	End	29,945,884 bp

Gene location (Mouse)
Chr.	Chromosome 17 (mouse)
Band	17 B1|17 18.64 cM	Start	35,561,218 bp
Band	17 B1|17 18.64 cM	End	35,565,738 bp
RNA expression pattern
Bgee	Human / Mouse (ortholog); Top expressed in: blood; granulocyte; stromal cell of endometrium; spleen; mucosa of transverse colon; duodenum; right lung; upper lobe of left lung; appendix; lymph node / Top expressed in: epithelium of small intestine; ileum; islet of Langerhans; intestinal villus; Paneth cell; thymus; migratory enteric neural crest cell; left colon; jejunum; duodenum; More reference expression data
BioGPS	n/a
Gene ontology
Molecular function	beta-2-microglobulin binding; TAP binding; peptide antigen binding; protein binding
Cellular component	integral component of membrane; phagocytic vesicle membrane; Golgi apparatus; early endosome membrane; Golgi membrane; plasma membrane; integral component of plasma membrane; cell surface; endoplasmic reticulum; ER to Golgi transport vesicle membrane; integral component of lumenal side of endoplasmic reticulum membrane; MHC class I protein complex; membrane; recycling endosome membrane; endoplasmic reticulum membrane; extracellular exosome
Biological process	antigen processing and presentation; antigen processing and presentation of exogenous peptide antigen via MHC class I, TAP-dependent; interferon-gamma-mediated signaling pathway; immune system process; antigen processing and presentation of exogenous peptide antigen via MHC class I, TAP-independent; type I interferon signaling pathway; regulation of immune response; viral process; immune response; antigen processing and presentation of peptide antigen via MHC class I; protein ubiquitination; T cell mediated cytotoxicity; CD8-positive, alpha-beta T cell activation; antigen processing and presentation of exogenous peptide antigen via MHC class I; positive regulation of T cell mediated cytotoxicity; T cell mediated cytotoxicity directed against tumor cell target; antigen processing and presentation of endogenous peptide antigen via MHC class I; adaptive immune response
Sources:Amigo / QuickGO
Orthologs
Databases	NCBI: entry; OMA: entry
Species	Human	Mouse
Entrez	3105	15013
Ensembl	ENSG00000206505; ENSG00000224320; ENSG00000206503; ENSG00000223980; ENSG00000229215 ENSG00000227715; ENSG00000235657; ENSG00000231834	ENSMUSG00000091705
UniProt	P04439; Q5SUL5	n/a
RefSeq (mRNA)	NM_001242758; NM_002116	NM_010392; NM_001368740
RefSeq (protein)	NP_001229687; NP_002107; NP_001229687.1	n/a
Location (UCSC)	Chr 6: 29.94 – 29.95 Mb	Chr 17: 35.56 – 35.57 Mb
PubMed search
- Wikidata
View/Edit Human	View/Edit Mouse

The HLA-A gene is located on the short arm of chromosome 6 and encodes the larger, α-chain, constituent of HLA-A. Variation of HLA-A α-chain is key to HLA function. This variation promotes genetic diversity in the population. Since each HLA has a different affinity for peptides of certain structures, a greater variety of HLAs means that a greater variety of antigens can be 'presented' on the cell surface, enhancing the likelihood that a subset of the population will be resistant to a given foreign invader. This decreases the likelihood that a single pathogen has the capability to wipe out the entire human population.

Each individual can express up to two types of HLA-A, one from each of their parents. Some individuals will inherit the same HLA-A from both parents, decreasing their individual HLA diversity; however, the majority of individuals will receive two different copies of HLA-A. This same pattern follows for all HLA groups. In other words, every single person can only express either one or two of the 2432 known HLA-A alleles.

=== Alleles ===
All HLAs are assigned a name by the World Health Organization Naming Committee for Factors of the HLA System. This name is organized to provide the most information about the particular allele while keeping the name as short as possible. An HLA name looks something like this:

HLA-A*02:01:01:02L

All alleles receive at least a four digit classification (HLA-A*02:12). The A signifies which HLA gene the allele belongs to. There are many HLA-A alleles, so that classification by serotype simplifies categorization. The next pair of digits indicates this assignment. For example, HLA-A*02:02, HLA-A*02:04, and HLA-A*02:324 are all members of the A2 serotype (designated by the *02 prefix). This group is the primary factor responsible for HLA compatibility. All numbers after this cannot be determined by serotyping and are designated through gene sequencing. The second set of digits indicates what HLA protein is produced. These are assigned in order of discovery and as of December 2013 there are 456 different HLA-A*02 proteins known (assigned names HLA-A*02:01 to HLA-A*02:456). The shortest possible HLA name includes both of these details. Each extension beyond that signifies synonymous mutations within the coding region and mutations outside the coding region. The interpretation of the extensions is covered in greater detail in current HLA naming system.

=== Protein ===
The protein coded for by the HLA-A gene is 365 amino acids long and weighs roughly 41,000 daltons (Da). It contains 8 exons.

Exon	Protein segment
1	Signal peptide
2	α1 domain
3	α2 domain
4	α3 domain
5	transmembrane region
6	cytoplasmic tail
7	cytoplasmic tail
8	Unspecified

The HLA-A signal peptide is a series of hydrophobic amino acids present at the N-terminus of the protein that directs it to the endoplasmic reticulum where the remaining seven domains are translated. The three α domains form the binding groove that holds a peptide for presentation to CD8+ t-cells. The transmembrane region is the region that is embedded in the phospholipid bilayer surrounding the ER lumen. The HLA-A protein is a single-pass transmembrane protein. In other words, the first four domains of the protein are inside the ER lumen, while the last three domains are present outside the lumen, giving the protein the orientation required for proper function. The last three domains of the protein form a tail of primarily β-sheets that remains in the cell's cytosol.

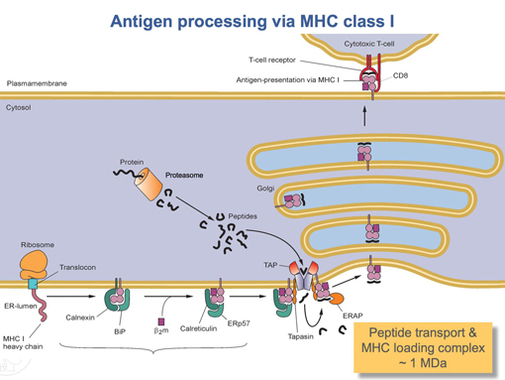
Tracking the process of translating, assembling, and expressing the HLA-A gene

Once the HLA-A protein is completely translated, it must be folded into the proper shape. A molecular chaperone protein called calnexin and an enzyme called ERp57 assist in the folding process. Calnexin holds the HLA-A heavy chain while Erp57 catalyzes disulfide bonds between the heavy chain and the light, β_{2}-microglobulin chain. This bond induces a conformational change in the heavy chain, forming the binding groove. Calnexin then dissociates with the complex, now referred to as a peptide loading complex, and is replaced by calreticulin, another chaperone protein. Short peptides are continually transported from around the cell into the ER lumen by a specialized transport protein called TAP. TAP then binds to the peptide loading complex along with another protein, called tapasin. At this point the peptide loading complex consists of HLA-A (heavy chain), β_{2}-microglobulin (light chain), an ERp57 enzyme, calreticulin chaperone protein, TAP (with a bound peptide fragment), and tapasin. Tapasin increases the stability of TAP, in addition to stabilizing the entire peptide loading complex. At this point TAP releases the peptide it transported into the ER lumen. The proximity of the HLA-A binding groove to TAP is ensured by the peptide loading complex. This increases the likelihood that the peptide will find the groove. If the peptide's affinity for the HLA-A protein is great enough, it binds in the groove. Research suggests that tapasin may actively load peptides from TAP into the HLA-A complex while also holding class I molecules in the ER lumen until a high affinity peptide has been bound.

After a peptide of high enough affinity has bonded to the class I MHC, calreticulin, ERp57, TAP, and tapasin release the molecule. At this point the class I complex consists of an HLA-A protein bonded to a β_{2}-microglobulin and a short peptide. It is still anchored in the ER membrane by the transmembrane domain. At some point the ER will receive a signal and the portion of the membrane holding the complex will bud off and be transported to the golgi bodies for further processing. From the golgi bodies, the complex is transported, again via vesicle transport, to the cell membrane. This is the point at which the orientation mentioned previously becomes important. The portion of the HLA-A complex holding the peptide must be on the exterior surface of the cell membrane. This is accomplished by vesicle fusion with the cell membrane.

== Function ==
=== Natural function ===
MHC Class I molecules present small peptides, typically 7-10 amino acids in length, to the immune system. A glycoprotein called CD8 binds to residues 223–229 in the α3 domain of HLA-A and this glycoprotein stabilizes interactions between the t-cell receptor on cytotoxic (CD8^{+}) T-lymphocytes and the Class I MHC. The T-cell receptor also has the potential to bind to the peptide being presented by the MHC. In a properly functioning immune system, only T-cells that do not bind self peptides are allowed out of the thymus, thus, if a T-cell binds to the peptide, it must be a foreign or abnormal peptide. The T-cell then initiates apoptosis, or programmed cell death. This process can happen as quickly as 5 minutes after initial foreign antigen presentation, although typically it takes several hours for death to become apparent. This process is the basis of acquired immunity and serves as the primary defense against viruses and other intracellular pathogens.

=== Other activities ===
By the 1960s, it became evident that factors on donated organs and tissues often resulted in destruction of the donated tissue by the host's immune system. MHCs were originally discovered as a result of this observation (see history of HLAs for more details). There are two types of peptide presenting complexes, Class I and Class II MHCs. Each of these has multiple HLA genes, of which HLA-A is but one. There are three major HLAs that should be matched between donors and recipients. They are HLA-A, HLA-B, (both Class I MHCs) and HLA-DR (a Class II MHC). If the two tissues have the same alleles coding for these three HLAs, the likelihood and severity of rejection is minimized.

== Role in disease ==
HLA-A associated diseases
Associated disease	Serotypes		
Ankylosing spondylitis	A24		
Diabetes, type-I	A1	A24	
Hemochromatosis (lower CD8+ cells)	A3		
Myasthenia gravis	A3	A24	A30
Leukemia, T-cell, Adult	A26	A68	
Multiple sclerosis	A3		
Papilloma virus susept.	A11		
Spontaneous abortion	A2		

HLAs serve as the sole link between the immune system and what happens inside cells. Thus any alteration on the part of the HLA, be it decreased binding to a certain peptide or increased binding to a certain peptide, is expressed as, respectively, increased susceptibility to disease or decreased susceptibility to disease. In other words, certain HLAs may be incapable of binding any of the short peptides produced by proteolysis of pathogenic proteins. If this is the case, there is no way for the immune system to tell that a cell is infected. Thus the infection can proliferate largely unchecked. It works the other way too. Some HLAs bind pathogenic peptide fragments with very high affinity. This in essence "supercharges" their immune system in regards to that particular pathogen, allowing them to manage an infection that might otherwise be devastating.

=== HIV/AIDS ===
One of the most researched examples of differential immune regulation of a pathogen is that of human immunodeficiency virus. Because HIV is an RNA virus, it mutates incredibly quickly. This changes the peptides produced via proteolysis, which changes the peptides able to be presented to the immune system by the infected cell's MHCs. Any virus with a mutation that creates a peptide with high affinity for a particular HLA is quickly killed by the immune system, and thus does not survive and that high affinity peptide is no longer produced. However, it turns out that even HIV has some conserved regions in its genome, and if a HLA is capable of binding to a peptide produced from a conserved region, there is little the HIV can do to avoid immune detection and destruction. This is the principle behind HLA-mediated differential HIV loads.

With over 2000 variations of the HLA-A coded MHC, it is difficult to determine the impact of all variants upon HIV loads. However, a select few have been implicated. HLA-A*30 has been shown to decrease viral load to less than 10,000 copies/cubic millimeter, considered quite low. On the other hand, HLA-A*02 has been implicated in high viral load (greater than 100,000 copies/cubic millimeter) when associated with HLA-B*45. Additionally, the haplotypes HLA-A*23-C*07 and HLA-A*02-C*16 typically expressed increased viral loads within the sample population of Zambians. One of the most effective HIV-inhibiting haplotypes was HLA-A*30-C*03 while one of the least effective was HLA-A*23*B*14. In summation, HLA-A*23 was highly correlated with increased HIV load among the sample population, although across samples of differing ethnicity this correlation decreases significantly.

Although classification of the effect of individual HLA genes and alleles on the presence of HIV is difficult, there are still some strong conclusions that can be made. Individuals who are homozygous in one or more Class I HLA genes typically progress to AIDS much more rapidly than heterozygotes. In some homozygous individuals the rate of progression is double that of heterozygotes. This differential progression is correlated fairly tightly with the degree of heterozygosity. In summation, certain HLA-A alleles are associated with differing viral loads in HIV infected patients; however, due to the diversity amongst those alleles, it is difficult to classify each and every allele's impact upon immune regulation of HIV. Nevertheless, it is possible to correlate heterozygosity in HLA-A alleles to decreased rate of progression to AIDS.

Not only do certain HLA alleles prescribe increased or decreased resistance to HIV, but HIV is able to alter HLA expression, and does so selectively leading to reduced elimination by natural killer cells (NK cells). Research has shown that HIV downregulates Class I MHC expression in infected cells. However, doing so indiscriminately opens up the opportunity for attack by NK cells, because NK cells respond to downregulation of HLA-C and HLA-E. Obviously, this mechanism has put selective pressure on the HIV virus. Thus, HIV has evolved the capability to downregulate HLA-A and HLA-B without significantly disturbing the expression of HLA-C and HLA-E. A protein coded for by the HIV genome, negative regulatory factor (Nef), induces this change by binding to the cytoplasmic tail of the Class I MHC while it is still in the endoplasmic reticulum or occasionally while it is in the early stages of trafficking through the golgi bodies. This complex of MHC and Nef then causes adaptor protein 1 (AP-1) to direct the MHC to the lysosomes for degradation instead of to the cell membrane where it normally functions. In addition to selective HLA downregulation, negative regulatory factor (Nef) enables HIV to downregulate CD4 and CD8. These glycoproteins are essential for, respectively, helper t-cell and cytotoxic t-cell binding to MHCs. Without these cofactors, both types of t-cells are less likely to bind to HLAs and initiate apoptosis, even if the HLA is expressing an HIV derived (non-self) peptide. Both of these proteins are also targeted at their cytoplasmic tail domain. The combination of these abilities greatly enhances HIV's ability to avoid detection by the immune system.

== Summary ==
HLA-A is one particular group of the human Class I MHCs. It consists of several hundred different genes and several thousand variant alleles. HLA-A is critical to the cytotoxic t-cell controlled immune response to viruses and other intracellular pathogens. Because each HLA-A gene has a high affinity for slightly different peptides, certain HLA-As are associated with increased risk, more rapid progression, and/or increased severity of many diseases. For similar reasons, HLA-A matching is essential to successful tissue transplants.
