= Protein subunit =

Structural unit of a protein complex

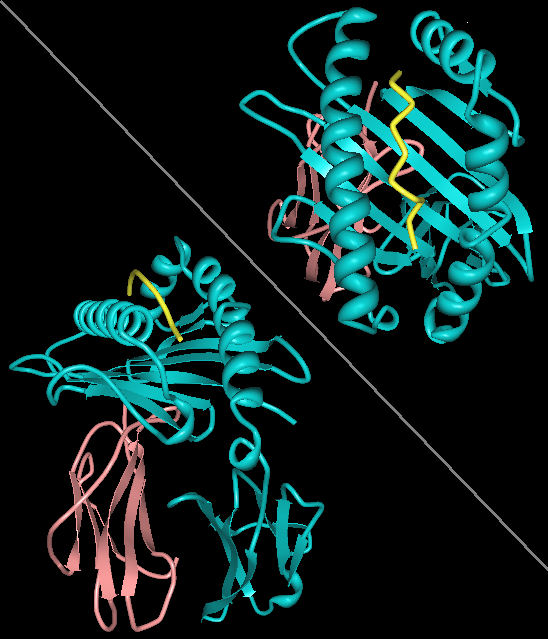
Rendering of HLA-A11 showing the α (A*1101 gene product) and β (Beta-2 microglobulin) subunits. This receptor has a bound peptide (in the binding pocket) of heterologous origin that also contributes to function.

In structural biology, a protein subunit is a polypeptide chain or single protein molecule that assembles (or "coassembles") with others to form a protein complex. Large assemblies of proteins such as viruses often use a small number of types of protein subunits as building blocks.

A subunit is often named with a Greek or Roman letter, and the numbers of this type of subunit in a protein is indicated by a subscript. For example, ATP synthase has a type of subunit called α. Three of these are present in the ATP synthase molecule, leading to the designation α_{3}. Larger groups of subunits can also be specified, like α_{3}β_{3}-hexamer and c-ring.

Naturally occurring proteins that have a relatively small number of subunits are referred to as oligomeric. For example, hemoglobin is a symmetrical arrangement of two identical α-globin subunits and two identical β-globin subunits. Longer multimeric proteins such as microtubules and other cytoskeleton proteins may consist of very large numbers of subunits. For example, dynein is a multimeric protein complex involving two heavy chains (DHCs), two intermediate chains (ICs), two light-intermediate chains (LICs) and several light chains (LCs).

The subunits of a protein complex may be identical, homologous or totally dissimilar and dedicated to disparate tasks. In some protein assemblies, one subunit may be a "catalytic subunit" that enzymatically catalyzes a reaction, whereas a "regulatory subunit" will facilitate or inhibit the activity. Although telomerase has telomerase reverse transcriptase as a catalytic subunit, regulation is accomplished by factors outside the protein.

An enzyme composed of both regulatory and catalytic subunits when assembled is often referred to as a holoenzyme. For example, class I phosphoinositide 3-kinase is composed of a p110 catalytic subunit and a p85 regulatory subunit. One subunit is made of one polypeptide chain. A polypeptide chain has one gene coding for it – meaning that a protein must have one gene for each unique subunit.

== See also ==
- Allostery
- Cooperativity
- Fusion protein
- Monomer
- Protein quaternary structure
- Subunit vaccine
