= Beta-2 microglobulin =

Component of MHC class I molecules

B2M

Identifiers
- Aliases: B2M, entrez:567, IMD43, beta-2-microglobulin, Β2 microglobulin
- External IDs: OMIM: 109700; MGI: 88127; GeneCards: B2M
Available structures
PDB	Ortholog search: PDBe RCSB
PDB	List of PDB id codes 1A1M, 1A1N, 1A1O, 1A6Z, 1A9B, 1A9E, 1AGB, 1AGC, 1AGD, 1AGE, 1AGF, 1AKJ, 1AO7, 1B0G, 1B0R, 1BD2, 1C16, 1CE6, 1DE4, 1DUY, 1DUZ, 1E27, 1E28, 1EEY, 1EEZ, 1EFX, 1EXU, 1GZP, 1GZQ, 1HHG, 1HHH, 1HHI, 1HHJ, 1HHK, 1HLA, 1HSA, 1HSB, 1I1F, 1I1Y, 1I4F, 1I7R, 1I7T, 1I7U, 1IM3, 1IM9, 1JF1, 1JGD, 1JGE, 1JHT, 1JNJ, 1K5N, 1KPR, 1KTL, 1LDS, 1LP9, 1M05, 1M6O, 1MHE, 1MI5, 1OF2, 1OGA, 1OGT, 1ONQ, 1PY4, 1Q94, 1QEW, 1QLF, 1QQD, 1QR1, 1QRN, 1QSE, 1QSF, 1QVO, 1R3H, 1S9W, 1S9X, 1S9Y, 1SYS, 1SYV, 1TMC, 1TVB, 1TVH, 1UQS, 1UXS, 1UXW, 1VGK, 1W0V, 1W0W, 1W72, 1X7Q, 1XH3, 1XR8, 1XR9, 1XZ0, 1YDP, 1YPZ, 1ZHK, 1ZHL, 1ZS8, 1ZSD, 1ZT4, 1ZVS, 2A83, 2AK4, 2AV7, 2AXF, 2AXG, 2BCK, 2BNQ, 2BNR, 2BSR, 2BSS, 2BST, 2BVO, 2BVP, 2BVQ, 2C7U, 2CII, 2CIK, 2CLR, 2D31, 2D4D, 2D4F, 2DYP, 2E8D, 2ESV, 2F53, 2F54, 2F74, 2F8O, 2GIT, 2GJ6, 2GT9, 2GTW, 2GTZ, 2GUO, 2H26, 2H6P, 2HJL, 2HLA, 2HN7, 2J8U, 2JCC, 2NW3, 2NX5, 2P5E, 2P5W, 2PO6, 2PYE, 2RFX, 2UWE, 2V2W, 2V2X, 2VB5, 2VLJ, 2VLK, 2VLL, 2VLR, 2X4N, 2X4O, 2X4P, 2X4Q, 2X4R, 2X4S, 2X4T, 2X4U, 2X70, 2X89, 2XKS, 2XKU, 2XPG, 2YPK, 2YPL, 2YXF, 2Z9T, 3AM8, 3B3I, 3B6S, 3BGM, 3BH8, 3BH9, 3BHB, 3BO8, 3BP4, 3BP7, 3BVN, 3BW9, 3BWA, 3BXN, 3BZE, 3BZF, 3C9N, 3CDG, 3CII, 3CIQ, 3CZF, 3D18, 3D25, 3D2U, 3D39, 3D3V, 3DBX, 3DHJ, 3DHM, 3DTX, 3DXA, 3EKC, 3FFC, 3FQN, 3FQR, 3FQT, 3FQU, 3FQW, 3FQX, 3FT2, 3FT3, 3FT4, 3GIV, 3GJF, 3GSN, 3GSO, 3GSQ, 3GSR, 3GSU, 3GSV, 3GSW, 3GSX, 3H7B, 3H9H, 3H9S, 3HAE, 3HCV, 3HG1, 3HLA, 3HPJ, 3HUJ, 3I6G, 3I6K, 3I6L, 3IB4, 3IXA, 3JTS, 3KLA, 3KPO, 3KPR, 3KPS, 3KWW, 3KXF, 3KYN, 3KYO, 3L3D, 3L3G, 3L3I, 3L3J, 3L3K, 3LKN, 3LKO, 3LKP, 3LKQ, 3LKR, 3LKS, 3LN4, 3LN5, 3LOW, 3LV3, 3M17, 3M1B, 3MGO, 3MGT, 3MR9, 3MRB, 3MRC, 3MRD, 3MRE, 3MRF, 3MRG, 3MRH, 3MRI, 3MRJ, 3MRK, 3MRL, 3MRM, 3MRN, 3MRO, 3MRP, 3MRQ, 3MRR, 3MV7, 3MV8, 3MV9, 3MYJ, 3MYZ, 3MZT, 3NA4, 3NFN, 3O3A, 3O3B, 3O3D, 3O3E, 3O4L, 3OX8, 3OXR, 3OXS, 3PWJ, 3PWL, 3PWN, 3PWP, 3QDA, 3QDG, 3QDJ, 3QDM, 3QEQ, 3QFD, 3QFJ, 3QZW, 3RL1, 3RWJ, 3S6C, 3SDX, 3SJV, 3SKM, 3SKO, 3SPV, 3T8X, 3TID, 3TIE, 3TLR, 3TM6, 3TO2, 3TZV, 3U0P, 3UPR, 3UTQ, 3UTS, 3UTT, 3V5D, 3V5H, 3V5K, 3VCL, 3VFR, 3VFS, 3VFT, 3VFU, 3VFV, 3VFW, 3VH8, 3VRI, 3VRJ, 3VWJ, 3VWK, 3W39, 4E0K, 4E0L, 4E5X, 4EN3, 4EUP, 4F7M, 4F7P, 4F7T, 4FTV, 4FXL, 4G8G, 4G8I, 4G9D, 4G9F, 4GKS, 4GUP, 4HKJ, 4I4W, 4JFD, 4JFE, 4JFF, 4JFO, 4JFP, 4JFQ, 4JQX, 4JRX, 4JRY, 4K7F, 4KDT, 4L4T, 4L4V, 1CG9, 1N2R, 1P7Q, 1S8D, 1T1W, 1T1X, 1T1Y, 1T1Z, 1T20, 1T21, 1T22, 2AV1, 2FYY, 2FZ3, 2HJK, 3DX6, 3DX7, 3DX8, 3KPL, 3KPM, 3KPN, 3KPP, 3KPQ, 3LOZ, 3OV6, 3REW, 3RL2, 3VXM, 3VXN, 3VXO, 3VXP, 3VXR, 3VXS, 3VXU, 3W0W, 3WL9, 3WLB, 3WUW, 3X11, 3X12, 3X13, 3X14, 4GKN, 4HWZ, 4HX1, 4I48, 4K71, 4L29, 4L3C, 4L3E, 4LCW, 4LCY, 4LHU, 4LNR, 4M8V, 4MJ5, 4MJ6, 4MJI, 4MNQ, 4N0F, 4N0U, 4N8V, 4NNX, 4NNY, 4NO0, 4NO2, 4NO3, 4NO5, 4NQC, 4NQD, 4NQE, 4NQV, 4NQX, 4NT6, 4O2C, 4O2E, 4O2F, 4ONO, 4PJ5, 4PJ7, 4PJ8, 4PJ9, 4PJA, 4PJB, 4PJC, 4PJD, 4PJE, 4PJF, 4PJG, 4PJH, 4PJI, 4PJX, 4PR5, 4PRA, 4PRB, 4PRD, 4PRE, 4PRH, 4PRI, 4PRN, 4PRP, 4QOK, 4QRP, 4QRQ, 4QRR, 4QRS, 4QRT, 4QRU, 4U1H, 4U1I, 4U1J, 4U1K, 4U1L, 4U1M, 4U1N, 4U1S, 4U6X, 4U6Y, 4UQ2, 4UQ3, 4WJ5, 4WO4, 4WU5, 4WU7, 4X6C, 4X6D, 4X6E, 4X6F, 4XXC, 4WDI, 4Z76, 4Z77, 4Z78, 4R9H, 4RA3, 4RAH, 5D2L, 5D2N, 4WW2, 5DEG, 4RMT, 5DEF, 4RMW, 4RMV, 4RMR, 5D7J, 4RMQ, 4RMS, 4WWK, 5BXF, 5D5M, 5D7L, 4RMU, 4WUU, 5D7I, 5EU5, 5EO0, 5EO1, 5EU4, 5BRZ, 5EU6, 5BS0, 5EU3, 5C9J, 5D9S, 5HGA, 5C0D, 5C0B, 5C0I, 5C0A, 5B38, 5E9D, 5B39, 5C0H, 5HHN, 5HGD, 5C08, 5CFH, 5CKG, 4ZEZ, 5C0C, 5HGH, 5C0J, 5HHQ, 5DDH, 5HHM, 5HGB, 5C09, 5HYJ, 5CKA, 5C07, 5HHP, 5C0G, 5C0F, 5HHO, 5C0E

Gene location (Human)
Chr.	Chromosome 15 (human)
Band	15q21.1	Start	44,711,358 bp
Band	15q21.1	End	44,718,851 bp

Gene location (Mouse)
Chr.	Chromosome 2 (mouse)
Band	2 E5|2 60.55 cM	Start	121,978,167 bp
Band	2 E5|2 60.55 cM	End	121,983,564 bp
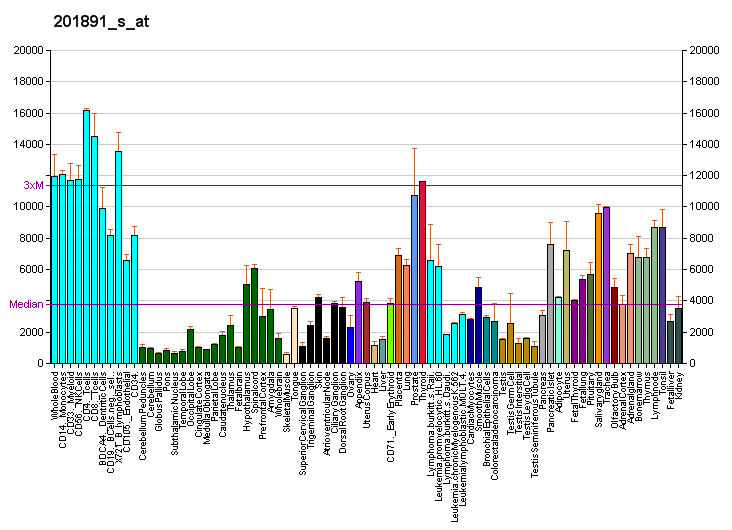

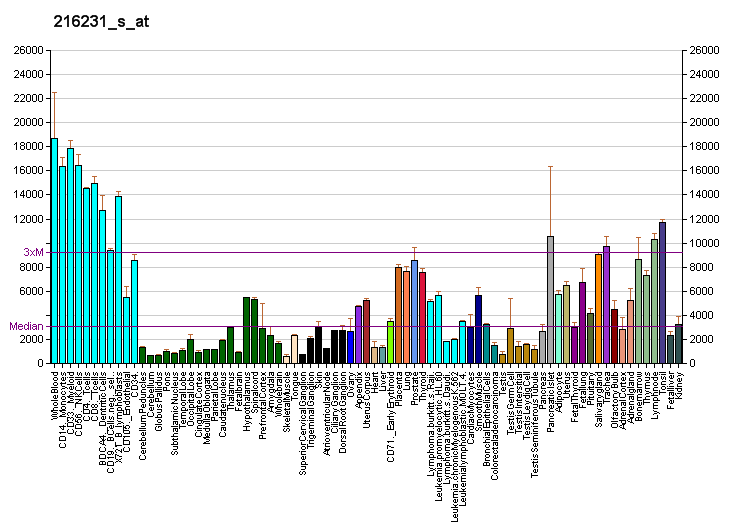
RNA expression pattern
Bgee	Human / Mouse (ortholog); Top expressed in: white blood cell; monocyte; gallbladder; granulocyte; appendix; lymph node; right lung; spleen; upper lobe of left lung; rectum / Top expressed in: seminal vesicula; lymph node; submandibular gland; mesenteric lymph nodes; right lung; white adipose tissue; right lung lobe; spleen; subcutaneous adipose tissue; thymus; More reference expression data
BioGPS	More reference expression data
Gene ontology
Molecular function	protein binding; identical protein binding
Cellular component	HFE-transferrin receptor complex; Golgi apparatus; phagocytic vesicle membrane; early endosome membrane; endoplasmic reticulum lumen; membrane; focal adhesion; Golgi membrane; plasma membrane; extracellular region; MHC class I protein complex; ER to Golgi transport vesicle membrane; early endosome lumen; extracellular exosome; external side of plasma membrane; extracellular space; cytosol; cell surface; specific granule lumen; recycling endosome membrane; tertiary granule lumen; MHC class I peptide loading complex
Biological process	positive regulation of receptor-mediated endocytosis; cellular response to iron ion; response to cadmium ion; negative regulation of receptor binding; negative regulation of neuron projection development; antigen processing and presentation of exogenous peptide antigen via MHC class I, TAP-dependent; T cell differentiation in thymus; immune system process; interferon-gamma-mediated signaling pathway; antigen processing and presentation of peptide antigen via MHC class I; iron ion homeostasis; positive regulation of T cell mediated cytotoxicity; mitigation of host defenses by virus; antigen processing and presentation of exogenous peptide antigen via MHC class I, TAP-independent; regulation of membrane depolarization; antigen processing and presentation of endogenous peptide antigen via MHC class I; positive regulation of ferrous iron binding; positive regulation of transferrin receptor binding; retina homeostasis; positive regulation of T cell cytokine production; protein refolding; immune response; regulation of immune response; positive regulation of receptor binding; positive regulation of protein binding; innate immune response; cellular response to lipopolysaccharide; response to molecule of bacterial origin; antigen processing and presentation of exogenous protein antigen via MHC class Ib, TAP-dependent; iron ion transport; neutrophil degranulation; regulation of erythrocyte differentiation; cellular response to iron(III) ion; antimicrobial humoral immune response mediated by antimicrobial peptide; positive regulation of iron ion import across plasma membrane; regulation of iron ion transport
Sources:Amigo / QuickGO
Orthologs
Databases	NCBI: entry; OMA: entry
Species	Human	Mouse
Entrez	567	12010
Ensembl	ENSG00000166710; ENSG00000273686	ENSMUSG00000060802
UniProt	P61769	P01887
RefSeq (mRNA)	NM_004048	NM_009735
RefSeq (protein)	NP_004039	NP_033865
Location (UCSC)	Chr 15: 44.71 – 44.72 Mb	Chr 2: 121.98 – 121.98 Mb
PubMed search
- Wikidata
View/Edit Human	View/Edit Mouse

β_{2} microglobulin (B2M) is a component of MHC class I molecules. MHC class I molecules have α_{1}, α_{2}, and α_{3} proteins which are present on all nucleated cells (excluding red blood cells). In humans, the β_{2} microglobulin protein is encoded by the B2M gene.

== Structure and function ==
Schematic representation of MHC class I

β_{2} microglobulin lies beside the α_{3} chain on the cell surface. Unlike α_{3}, β_{2} has no transmembrane region. Directly above β_{2} (that is, further away from the cell) lies the α_{1} chain, which itself is next to the α_{2}.

β_{2} microglobulin associates not only with the alpha chain of MHC class I molecules, but also with class I-like molecules such as CD1 (5 genes in humans), MR1, the neonatal Fc receptor (FcRn), and Qa-1 (a form of alloantigen). Nevertheless, the β_{2} microglobulin gene is outside of the MHC (HLA) locus, on a different chromosome.

An additional function is association with the HFE protein, together regulating the expression of hepcidin in the liver which targets the iron transporter ferroportin on the basolateral membrane of enterocytes and cell membrane of macrophages for degradation resulting in decreased iron uptake from food and decreased iron release from recycled red blood cells in the MPS (mononuclear phagocyte system) respectively. Loss of this function causes iron excess and hemochromatosis.

In a cytomegalovirus infection, a viral protein binds to β_{2} microglobulin, preventing assembly of MHC class I molecules and their transport to the plasma membrane.

Mice models deficient for the β_{2} microglobulin gene have been engineered. These mice demonstrate that β_{2} microglobulin is necessary for cell surface expression of MHC class I and stability of the peptide-binding groove. In fact, in the absence of β_{2} microglobulin, very limited amounts of MHC class I (classical and non-classical) molecules can be detected on the surface (bare lymphocyte syndrome or BLS). In the absence of MHC class I, CD8^{+} T cells cannot develop. (CD8^{+} T cells are a subset of T cells involved in the development of acquired immunity.)

== Clinical significance ==
In patients on long-term hemodialysis, it can aggregate into amyloid fibers that deposit in joint spaces, a disease, known as dialysis-related amyloidosis.

Low levels of β_{2} microglobulin can indicate non-progression of HIV.

Levels of β_{2} microglobulin can be elevated in multiple myeloma and lymphoma, though in these cases primary amyloidosis (amyloid light chain) and secondary amyloidosis (amyloid associated protein) are more common. The normal value of β_{2} microglobulin is < 2 mg/L. However, with respect to multiple myeloma, the levels of β_{2} microglobulin may also be at the other end of the spectrum. Diagnostic testing for multiple myeloma includes obtaining the β_{2} microglobulin level, for this level is an important prognostic indicator. As of 2011, a patient with a level < 4 mg/L is expected to have a median survival of 43 months, while one with a level > 4 mg/L has a median survival of only 12 months. β_{2} microglobulin levels cannot, however, distinguish between monoclonal gammopathy of undetermined significance (MGUS), which has a better prognosis, and smouldering (low grade) myeloma.

Loss-of-function mutations in this gene have been reported in cancer patients unresponsive to immunotherapies.

== Virus relevance ==
β_{2} microglobulin has been shown to be of high relevance for viral entry of Coxsackievirus A9 and Vaccinia virus (a Poxvirus). For Coxsackievirus A9, it is likely that β_{2} microglobulin is required for the transport to plasma membrane of the identified receptor, the Human Neonatal Fc Receptor (FcRn). However, the specific function for Vaccinia virus has not yet been elucidated.
