= Drug labelling =

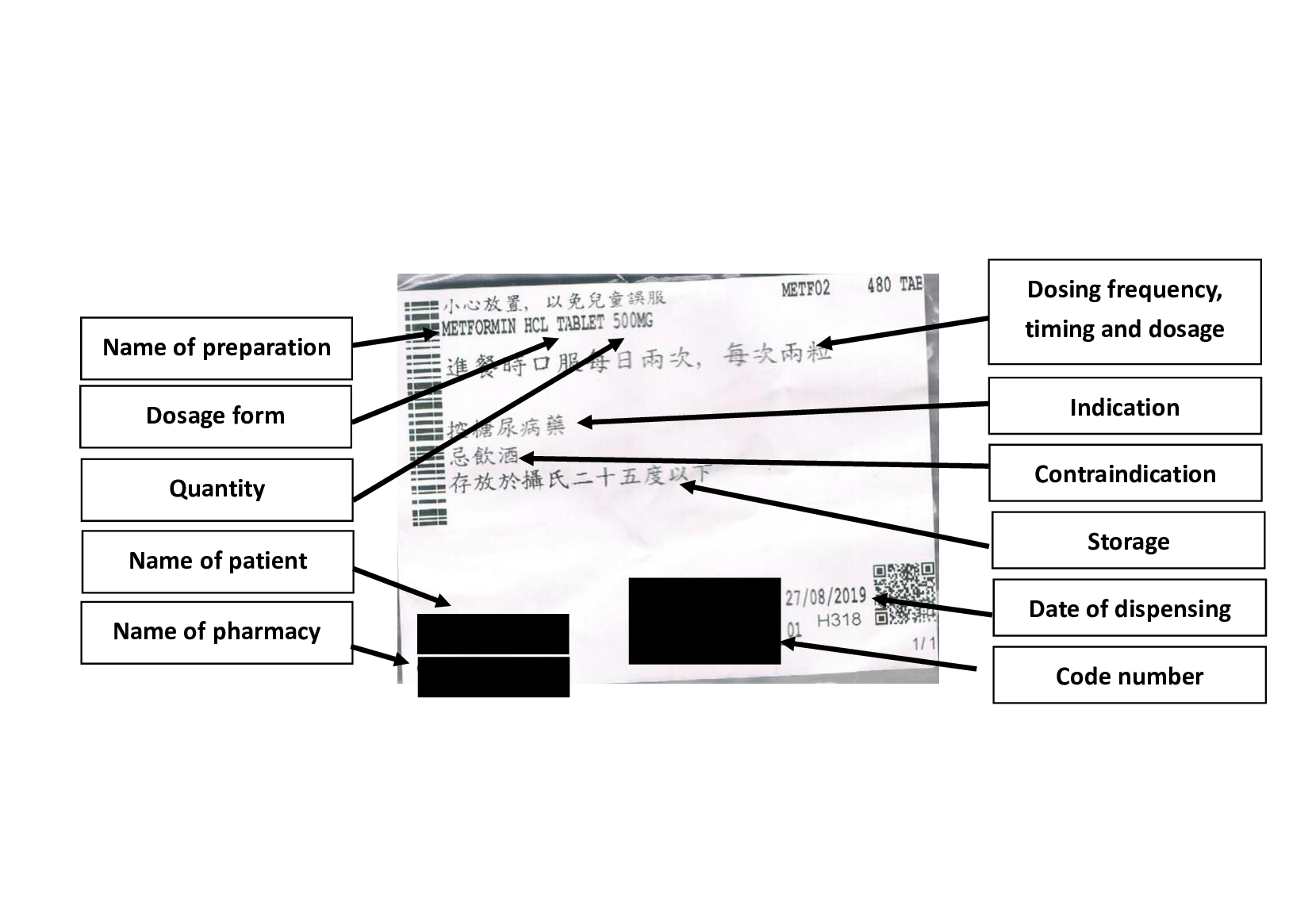
A typical drug label of prescription drugs from the Hospital Authority in Hong Kong. The details of label includes the name of preparation, quantity of drugs, instructions for patients, patient's name and the date of dispensing

Drug labelling, also referred to as prescription labelling, is a written, printed or graphic matter upon any drugs or any of its container, or accompanying such a drug. Drug labels seek to identify drug contents and to state specific instructions or warnings for administration, storage and disposal. Since the 1800s, legislation has been advocated to stipulate the formats of drug labelling due to the demand for an equitable trading platform, the need of identification of toxins and the awareness of public health. Variations in healthcare system, drug incidents and commercial utilization may attribute to different regional or national drug label requirements. Despite the advancements in drug labelling, medication errors are partly associated with undesirable drug label formatting.

== Evolution ==
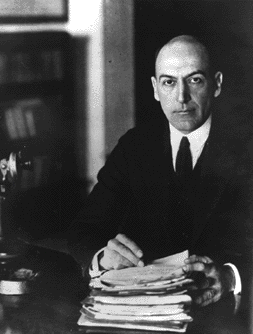
Walter G. Campbell, the first Commissioner of Food and Drugs, initiated the legal implementation of label labelling in USA.

=== Past development ===
In the US, early regulations of food and drug quality were predominantly fostered by fair competition between entrepreneurs and drug labelling was not legally mandatory until 1966. In 1906, the adoption of Food and Drugs Act in the US outlawed the business involving mislabeled, tainted or adulterated food, drinks, and drugs. The Sherley Amendment was later introduced to prohibit fabricated medical claims in drug labels. In 1937, misadventure of 107 persons as a consequence of tainted Elixir Sulfanilamide prescription initiated the requirement for prescription only medications. Walter G. Campbell, one of the pioneers in the regulations of drug safety, launched the legal process against spurious drugs and took the stewardship in Food and Drug Administration (FDA) in 1940. In 1950, a ruling in the U.S. Court of Appeals indicated the requirement of listing drug indication in drug labels. In 1962, a drug tragedy in Europe, thousands of defective infants as a result of the administration of thalidomide in pregnant women, dramatized the demand of drug safety profile prior to commercialization. Thousands of prescription medications were retreated as devoid of clinical evidence on effectiveness; and drug labels were required to reflect known medical facts according to the Fair Packaging and Labeling Act in 1966.

=== Recent development ===
Drug labelling is undergoing dynamic changes which become more patient-based and individual-centred thanks to the increased clinical evidence development. In February 1999, the introduction of population pharmacokinetics (PPK) in drug labelling established the significance of dose individualization in relation to age, gender, concurrent medication, disease state etc. The application of PPK became ubiquitous, particularly in pharmacological agents with narrow therapeutic index such as anticancer and anti-infective medications. In the same year, the standard drug label format for over-the-counter (OTC) drugs was launched for easy interpretation. In 2004, the utilization of cox-2 inhibitors was discouraged due to increased risks of stroke and heart attack in prolonged use. This commenced the addition of a precaution section in drug labels.

== Functions ==
Drug labelling plays crucial roles not only in the identification of active ingredients or excipients of a known drug, but also the provision of guidance for patients to ensure safety and appropriate administration of medicine. In the prospective of patients, drug labelling acknowledges patients' right to know and achieve optimum utilization of medicine. For healthcare practitioners, it renders the essential information required in prescription and dispensing. For example, pharmacists may identify the drug-related problems of patients during admission from accompanying drug packages.

== Requirements by countries or regions ==
Over the past centuries, drug incidents have been highly correlated to the imperfect or inadequate drug labelling, repercussions of which could be costly and deadly. Legal concerns of drug labelling was aroused in response to the public health crisis.

=== The United States ===
==== General requirements ====
As required by Title 21 of the Code of Federal Regulation, the established name of the drug and the name and quantity of each components should be conspicuously stated on the drug label. The label shall contain information about the name and address of the manufacturer, packer, or distributor. Besides, it shall contain adequate direction for use, including conditions and purposes, drug dosage, timing and route of administration. In general, the expiry date of the drug is required and shall appear on the mediate container and the outer package. Additional, label statements should be displayed with prominence and conspicuousness. The lot number, also called batch number, on the label should generate the full manufacturing history of the package.

==== Requirements for OTC drugs ====
There shall be a warning about use during pregnancy or breast-feeding if they are used for systemic absorption. Moreover, the label of oral OTC drugs should contain the contents of sodium, magnesium, calcium and potassium. Readable drug interactions with intrinsic complexity and accuracy should be provided to healthcare practitioners who may not be expertise in clinical pharmacology.

==== Requirements for prescription drugs ====
The label must state the recommended or usual dosage. Warning statements are required if the drug contains sulphite.

=== The United Kingdom ===
==== General requirements ====
Pursuant to article 54 of Council Directive 2001/83/EEC, the full registered name, dosage form, route of administration, posology and warnings of medicine should be incorporated in all drug labelling as regulated by the Medicines and Healthcare Products Regulatory Agency (MHRA) in the United Kingdom. Such statutory descriptions should be given greater prominence, not being interrupted by supplementary messages or background graphics, particularly the full registered name should be displayed with a minimum of 3 non-opposing faces of carton presentations for effective identification.

==== Requirements for OTC drugs ====
The labelling of OTC drugs should include registered indications as part of the statutory information for the self-selection by customers. Where a product relieves symptoms, any language guaranteeing the cure of conditions should not be applied, such as "stop coughing".

==== Requirements for prescription drugs ====
Unlike OTC medications, prescription medicine is not required to make reference to the approved indications.

=== Hong Kong ===
==== General requirements ====
In line with local legislations, a pharmaceutical product should fulfill several labelling requirements for the purpose of registration: the product name, the name and quantity of each active ingredient, the name and address of the manufacture, Hong Kong registration number, batch number, expiry date and storage instructions, if any. Additional labelling may be required in certain drug classes; For example, angiotensin-converting enzyme (ACE) inhibitors such as lisinopril should be indicated with "Caution. Contraindicated in pregnancy".

==== Requirements for sub-category ====
In Hong Kong, drugs are stratified as Non-Poisons, Part II Poisons, Part 1 only Poisons, Schedule 1 only Poisons, Schedule 3 Poisons, Schedule 5 Poisons, Antibiotics and Dangerous Drug. For Non-poisons and Part 2 Poison, the dose regimen, route and frequency of administration of the product should be exhibited in both English and Chinese. "Drug under Supervised Sales" should be displayed in medicines containing Part 1 Poisons, except Third Schedule Poison, which should be labelled as "Prescription Drug".

== Medication errors associated with drug labelling ==
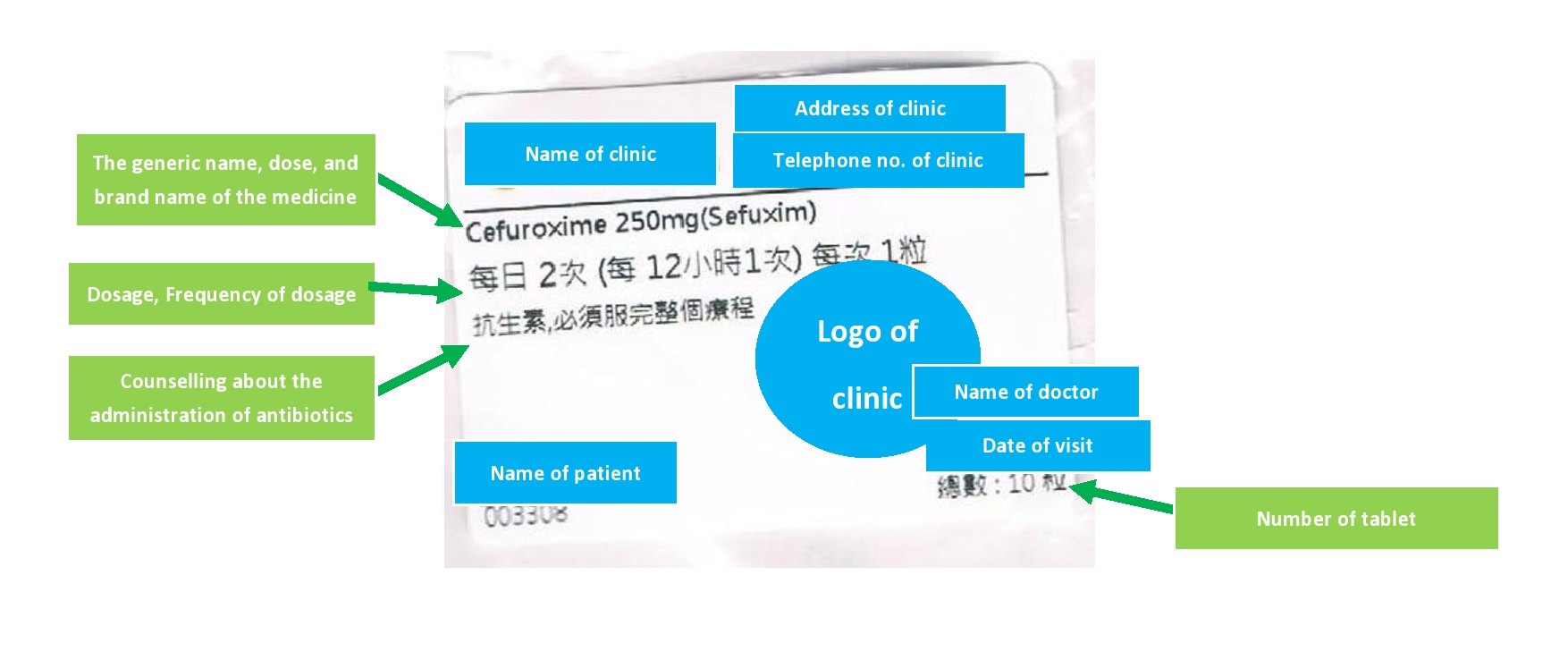
A drug label retrieved from a random clinic in Hong Kong. Over-prominence of the logo of clinics may be susceptible to the poor interpretation of drugs by patients.

An effective drug label should demonstrate efficacy and safety. Imperfect drug label information or design may lead to misinterpretation and hence medication errors.

=== Non-standardized label format ===
Failure of drug identification by medical practitioners was reported in Hong Kong, because of the adoption of non-standardized label formats by physicians in private clinics. In the incident, healthcare providers failed to recognize that 4-hydroxyacetanilide was identical to Paracetamol. Unknown medication history due to confusion amongst generic names, brand names and chemical names may place the security of patient in jeopardy. Standardized drug labelling not only nurtures the habits of label perusal by users, but also enhances patient safety.

=== Undesirable label design ===
Inappropriate information hierarchy may impede the prescription understanding by patients. This may lead to medication errors in drug prescribing, dispensing or administration, particularly in geriatric, illiterate, visually impaired or cognitively impaired population, predisposing them to non-adherence.

== Recommended practices for drug labelling ==
Optimum design of drug labelling is an essential pharmacological goal which helps eradicate adverse events such as withdrawal symptoms, complications and misadventure. Therefore, multiple practices are recommended to modify drug labelling.

=== Tall Man lettering ===
Errors have been reviewed in certain drugs of similar registered name. Likelihood of dispensing error can be reduced by adopting Tall Man lettering or other means of highlighting the key component of the drug name. Examples are as follows

Cephalosporins	Tallman Labelling
cefadroxil	cefADROxil
cefalexin	cefALEXin
cefazolin	cefAZOLin

=== Quick Response codes ===
Inclusion of Quick Response (QR) codes on labelling can be allowed only if the contents are compatible to the summary of product characteristics, practical for patients and non-promotional, such as diseases information and recommendations for lifestyle modifications.

== Future development ==
The benefit-risk profile of a drug varies in populations of different genomes, the study of which is known as pharmacogenomics. Pharmacogenomic testing can be performed to select patients for suitable clinical intervention. Incorporation of pharmacogenomic information in drug labels can help prevent adverse drug events and optimize drug dose. Such information may include the risks for adverse reactions, genotype-specific dosing, clinical response variability etc. For example, Chinese patients possessing HLA-B*1502 who are using carbamazepine should not be administered phenytoin due to the strong evidence of developing lethal Stevens-Johnson Symptoms or toxic epidermal necrolysis.

== See also ==
- Drug policy of the United States
- Drug policy of the United Kingdom
- Medication package insert
- Auxiliary label
