= B63 =

B63 may refer to:

- Sicilian, Richter-Rauzer, Rauzer attack, according to the list of chess openings
- HLA-B63, an HLA-B serotype
- Bundesstraße 63, a German road
- B63 (New York City bus) in Brooklyn
- 63 amp, type B – a standard circuit breaker current rating
- B63 (NSW Hwy)
