= HLA-B46 =

Human leukocyte antigen serotype

major histocompatibility complex (human), class I, B46
Alleles	B*4601
Structure (See HLA-B)
Symbol(s)	HLA-B
EBI-HLA	B*4601
Locus	chr.6 6p21.31

HLA-B46 (B46) is an HLA-B serotype. The serotype identifies the gene products of HLA-B*4601 allele. B*4601 resulted from a rare, interlocus, gene conversion between B62, probably B*1501, and a HLA-C allele. B*4601 is the most common HLA-B allele that does not have an origin within Africa, and estimated 400 million people in Eastern Asia carry a B46 allele. When found B*4601 segregates with only 2 HLA-Cw alleles, A limited number of HLA-A and HLA-DRB1 alleles suggesting that the allele recently expanded from a limited sized group within SE Asia. Extremely low frequencies outside of Eastern Asia are indicators of a recent expansion of B46 from a recently small population. The frequency distribution suggests the ancestral B46 population was in SE China, or, potentially Burma (Myanmar or Laos, untested). B46 in Asia correlates with wet-rice farming. The exceptions are notable, it has been found in the Nivkhi on north-eastern Sakalin Island, the Ainu, and the Nivkhi-related (genetically) Tlinglet population of Alaska at trace levels.

== Serotype ==
B46 serotype recognition of Some HLA B*46 allele-group gene products
B*46	B46	Other	Sample
allele	%	%	size (N)
4601	59	29	1487

The serotyping is poor for B*4601 and it is preferable to use SSP-PCR. B*46:01 is one of the four B alleles that reacts with neither Bw4 nor Bw6. The others are B*18:06, B*55:03 and B*73:01.

== B*4601 Allele Frequencies ==
HLA B*4601 frequencies
		freq
ref.	Population	(%)
	Buyei (China)	21.6
	Miao (China)	18.4
	Han (2) (Yunnan, China)	17.9
	Thai (in Singapore)	17.2
	Southern Chinese (in Taiwan)	17.2
	Chinese (in Hong Kong)	16.3
	Hakka (2)(Taiwan)	15.6
	Guangzhou (China)	15.5
	Northeastern Thailand	15.1
	Minnan (Avg 1 & 2) (Taiwan)	15.0
	Middle' Chinese (in Taiwan)	15.0
	Hakka (Taiwan)	13.6
	Wuhan (China)	13.5
	Maonan (Guangxi, China)	13.4
	Chinese (in Singapore)	13.4
	Vietnamese	13.2
	Southern Han (China)	11.5
	Shanghai (China)	11.2
	Meizhou Han (Guangdong, China)	10.0
	Shijiazhuang Tianjian Han (Beijing)	9.6
	Guangzhou Han (China)	9.4
	Thailand	9.2
	Nu (Yunnan, China)	9.0
	Northern Chinese (in Taiwan)	8.6
	Pazeh (Taiwan)	8.2
	Aichi (Japan)	7.6
	Lisu (Yunnan, China)	7.2
	Beijing (China)	6.8
	Naxi (Yunnan, China)	6.1
	Hui (Qinghai, China)	5.9
	Northern Han (China)	5.7
	Japan (3)	5.0
	Hyogo (Japan)	4.7
	South Korea (3)	4.4
	Man (Harbin City, China)	4.1
	Siraya (Taiwan)	3.9
	Central Japan	3.6
	Linqu County (Shandong, China)	3.3
	Timorese	2.6
	Inner Mongolia (China)	2.0
	Javanese (in Singapore)	2.0
	Oold (Mongolia)	1.9
	Nivkhi (Sakhalin I, Russia) sland	1.9
	Thao (Taiwan)	1.7
	Riau Malay (in Singapore)	1.5
	Tuva (2) (Russia)	1.4
	Tibetan (China)	1.3
	Khalkh (Ulaanbaatar, Mongolia)	1.2
	Ainu (Hokkaidō, Japan)	1.0
	Okinawa (in Hawaii, USA)	1.0
	Indigenous (Taiwan)	0.9
	Khalkha (Mongolia)	0.5
	Brahui (Pakistan)	0.5

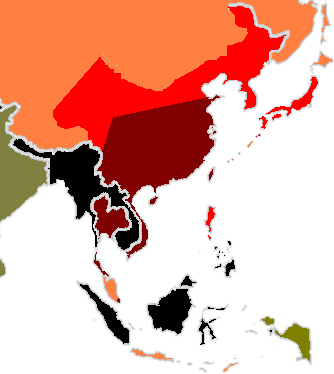
HLA-B*4601 abundance Dark Red = 7% or greater Red = 3 to 7% Orange = 1 to 3% Green = O to 1% Black = regions not typed

=== A2-Cw11(1)-B46 ===
This haplotype is unique in several regards, first and most importantly the B46 serotype is not from Africa, this distinguishes it from every other known B serotype. It is the result of a recombination event between B62(B*1501) and an HLA-C allele within Asia. This event happened recently as there is only one major allele and minor alleles are at trace frequencies. There has been some recombination between this haplotype, A24 and A11 bearing alleles, probably in a local (or tribal population). B46 is found wherever Asian wet-rice farming peoples have traveled and is found at low frequencies in non-farming indigenous groups. The one exception is the Ninhvet of Siberia and the Eastern Tlinglet of Alaska. This B46 contribution appears to have been recent. Because of the numbers of people represented by the sample groups, and its relative high frequency in those group A2-B46 is one of the most frequent, if not the most frequent A-B haplotype in the world, even though it is absent from the indigenous populations of most peoples in the world.

HLA A2-B46 haplotype frequencies
		freq		Rank in
ref.	Population	(%)		Pop.
	Buyi	16.6	^{1}	1
	Miao	13.6		1
	Singapore (Chinese)	11.4		2
	Chaoshan	10.1		1
	Southern Han	7.8		2
	VietNam	7.8		1
	Thai	7.2		1
	Thai Chinese	4.0
	Japanese	3.3		4
	Li	3.0
	Korea	2.8
	Uygar	2.7
	Manchu	2.6
	Inner Mong.	1.9
	Northern Han	1.8
^{1} highest freq. A-B hap in Asia.

This haplotype is unique in several regards, first and most importantly the B46 serotype is not from Africa, this distinguishes it from every other major B serotype except B*48. It is the result of a recombination event between B62(B*1501) and an HLA-C allele within Asia. This event happened recently as there is only one major allele and minor alleles are at trace frequencies. There has been some recombination between this haplotype, A24 and A11 bearing alleles, probably in a local (or tribal population). B46 is found wherever Asian wet-rice farming peoples have traveled and is found at low frequencies in non-farming indigenous groups. The one exception is the Ninhvet of Siberia and the Eastern Tlinglet of Alaska. This B46 contribution appears to have been recent. Because of the numbers of people represented by the sample groups, and its relative high frequency in those group A2-B46 is one of the most frequent, if not the most frequent A-B haplotype in the world, even though it is absent from the indigenous populations of most peoples in the world.

The most common haplotype, and probably the ancestral haplotype given its distribution from the Ninhivet to Indonesia is:

A*0207 : C*0102 : B*4601 : DRB1*0901 : DQA1*0302 : DQB1*0303

A different haplotype that is more common in Korea and Japan is

A*0207 : C*0102 : B*4601 : DRB1*0803 : DQA1*0103 : DQB1*0601

B46, or a closely linked allele may have been under positive selection in rice farmers of Asia.
