= B62 =

B62 may refer to:

- Sicilian, Richter-Rauzer, Encyclopaedia of Chess Openings code
- HLA-B62, an HLA-B serotype
- Bundesstraße 62, a German road
- B62 (New York City bus) in Brooklyn
- B62 Studios, Indian film production company
