= B75 =

B75 or B-75 may refer to:

== Places and highways ==
- Bundesstraße 75, a German road
- Cobb Highway, in New South Wales, Australia, designated B75
- Sutton Coldfield, according to the list of postal districts in the United Kingdom

== Other ==
- Intel Ivy Bridge Chipset
- Sicilian Defense, Dragon Variation, according to the Encyclopaedia of Chess Openings
- Thor (rocket)
- HLA-B75, an HLA-B serotype
