= B77 =

B77 or B-77 may refer to:

- B77 Life, is a sustainable and ethical fashion brand with a QR code on each garment to trace the environmental impact of each product and it's organic fabric source and responsible manufacturing.
- B77, a 1980s solid-state reel-to-reel audio tape recorder by Swiss manufacturer Studer
- B77 nuclear bomb, a 1970s United States Air Force thermonuclear bomb
- B-77, a temporary initial designation of the 1959 US Air Force AGM-28 "Hound Dog" cruise missile
- Bundesstraße 77, a road in Germany
- HLA-B77, an HLA-B serotype
- Sicilian Defense, Dragon Variation, according to the Encyclopaedia of Chess Openings
- Tamworth, according to the list of postal districts in the United Kingdom
