= B73 =

B73 or B-73 may refer to:

- Bundesstraße 73, a German road
- Sicilian Defense, Dragon Variation, according to the Encyclopaedia of Chess Openings
- Sutton Coldfield, according to the list of postal districts in the United Kingdom
- HLA-B73, an HLA-B serotype
- B73 (maize), a long-established maize genome
