= B70 =

B70 or B-70 may refer to:

- B70 (chess opening), a code for the Dragon Variation from the Encyclopaedia of Chess Openings
- B70 (New York City bus), a public transit line in Brooklyn in New York City
- B-70 Valkyrie, a planned American supersonic bomber aircraft
- Bundesstraße 70, a federal highway in Germany
- CD86, a human protein also called B70
- HLA-B70, an HLA-B serotype
- West Bromwich, UK postcode
- The pennant number assigned to Turkish battlecruiser TCG Yavuz Sultan Selim
- Bestune B70, a sedan
