= Paracetamol/naproxen =

Combination drug

Combination of
- Paracetamol: Analgesic, antipyretic
- Naproxen: Nonsteroidal anti-inflammatory

Clinical data
- Trade names: Tylenol with Naproxen
- AHFS/Drugs.com: Micromedex Detailed Consumer Information
- Routes of administration: By mouth
- ATC code: N02BE51 (WHO)

Legal status
- Legal status: US: OTC

Paracetamol/naproxen, sold under the brand name Tylenol with Naproxen, is a fixed-dose combination of two medications, paracetamol (acetaminophen), an analgesic and antipyretic; and naproxen, as the sodium salt, a non-steroidal anti-inflammatory. It is available over-the-counter. The combination is manufactured by Kenvue Brands.

The combination was approved for medical use in the United States in July 2026.

== Medical uses ==
Paracetamol/naproxen is indicated for the temporary relief of minor aches and pains due to headache, backache, muscular aches, toothache, menstrual cramps, and minor pain of arthritis in people aged twelve years of age and older.

== Adverse effects ==
The labeling for the combination includes pregnancy-related recommendations consistent with all other acetaminophen- or NSAID-containing nonprescription products. Specifically, the label advises that those who are pregnant or breast-feeding ask a health professional before use. Also, the label indicates it is important not to use naproxen sodium at 20 weeks or later in pregnancy unless definitely directed to do so by a doctor.

== Social and culture ==
=== Legal status ===
The combination was approved for medical use in the United States in July 2026.

=== Names ===
Paracetamol/naproxen is sold under the brand name Tylenol with Naproxen.
