= Auxiliary label =

Warning or information added to prescription package

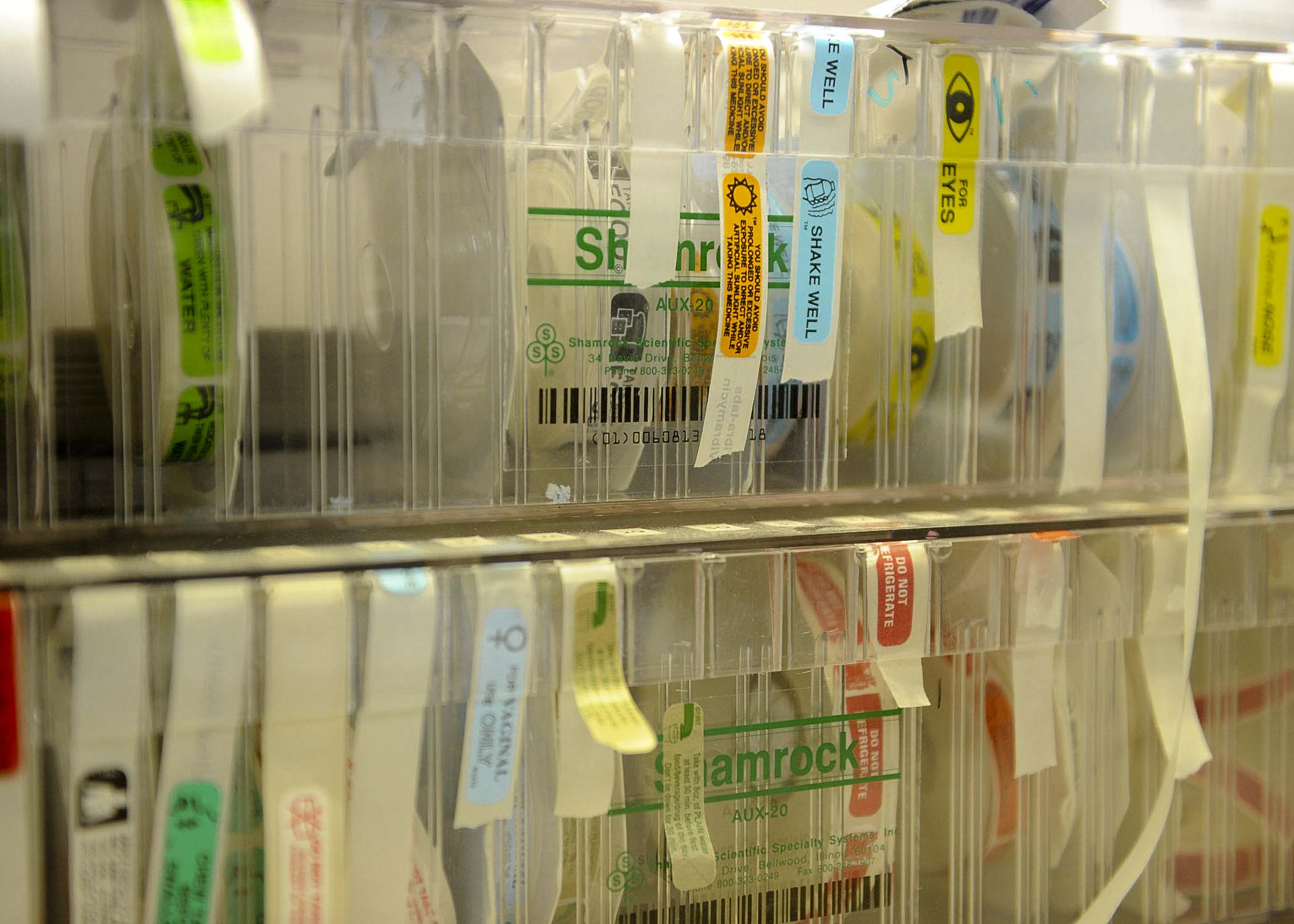
Examples of auxiliary labels placed on prescriptions.

An auxiliary label (also called cautionary and advisory label or prescription drug warning label) is a label added on to a dispensed medication package by a pharmacist in addition to the usual prescription label. The purpose of these labels is to offer additional information about the safe administration, use, and storage of the medication. While auxiliary labels can enhance understanding, they should not be considered a substitute for verbal counseling from a pharmacist.

== History ==
Auxiliary labels became popular during the second half of the nineteenth century.

In 2013, the first recommendations for auxiliary label usage in the United States were published as USP Chapter <17>. This included a recommendation to limit the use of auxiliary labels to evidence-based labels with critical information, and without pictures unless evidence shows increased efficacy when a picture is used. It is further recommended that labels are placed in a manner obvious to the patient without having to turn or rotate the package.

== Contents ==
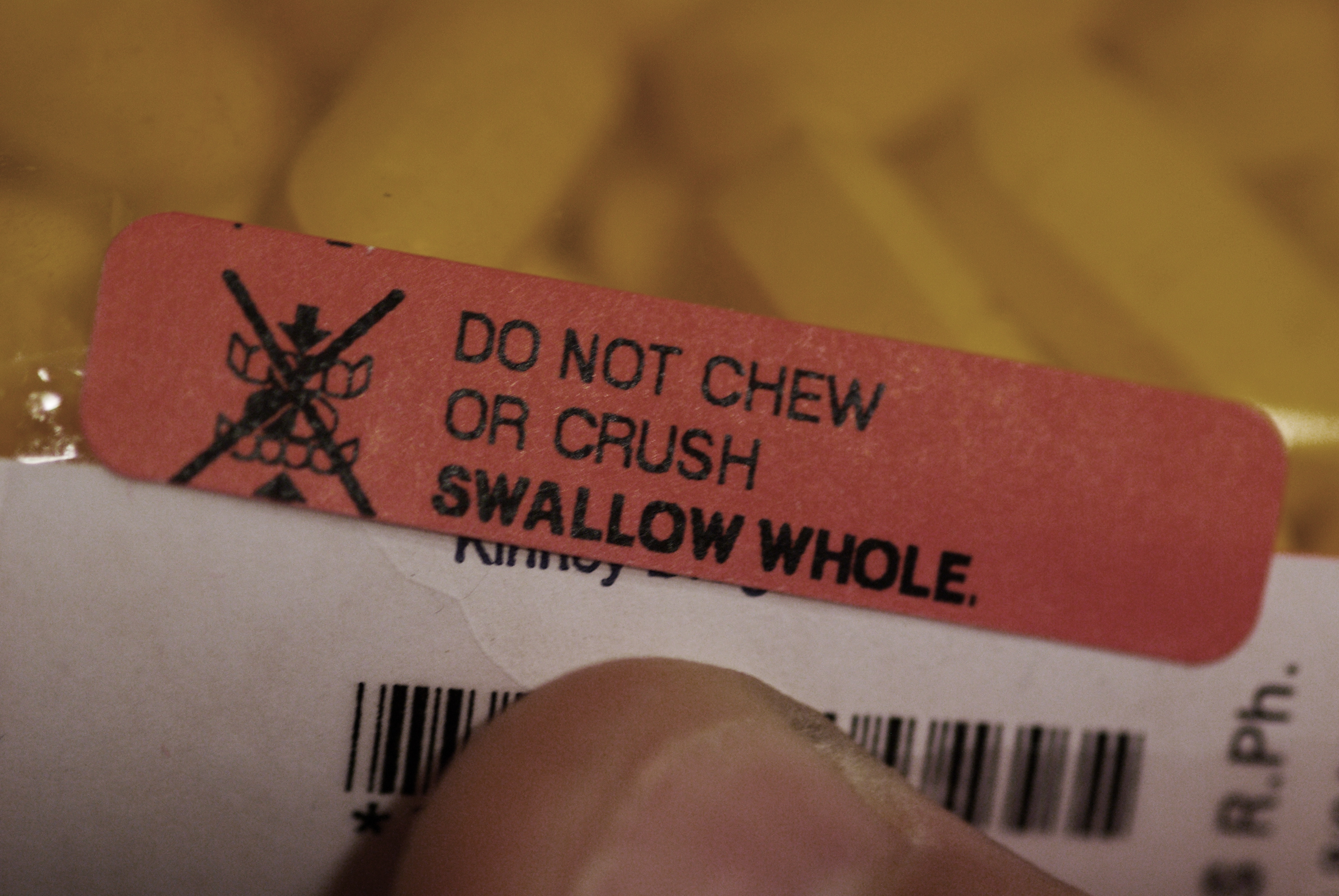
Auxiliary label stating the medication must be swallowed whole, without crushing or chewing.

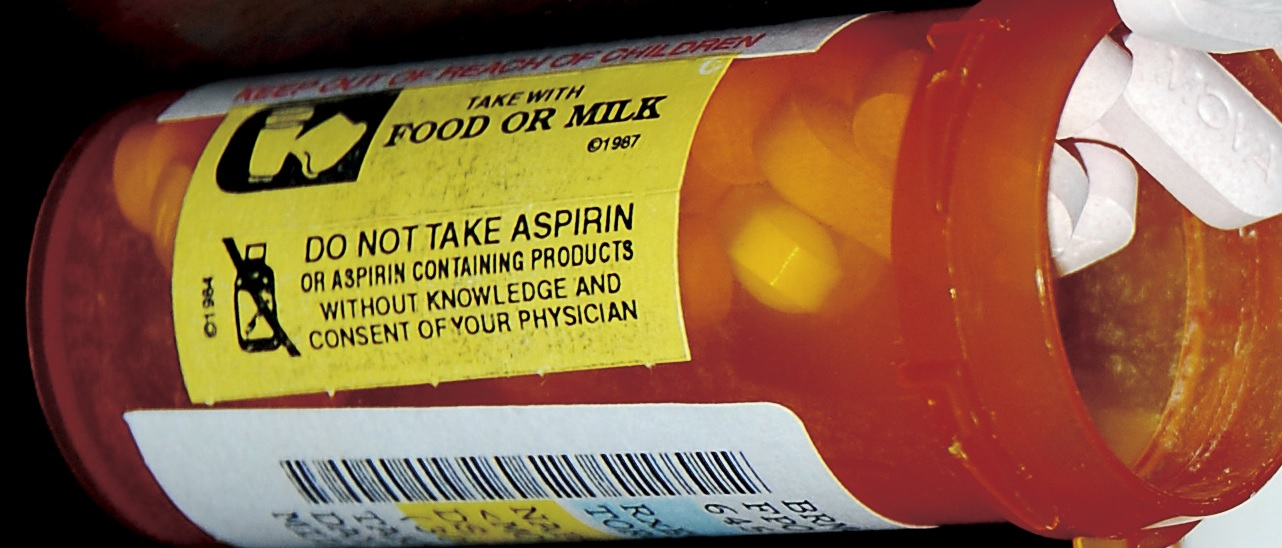
Auxiliary labels stating "take with food or milk" and "do not take with aspirin"

Auxiliary labels are small stickers consisting of one or more lines of text intended to enhance patient knowledge, with or without a pictogram. The directions for use included on the standard prescription label are typically limited to direct administration information, such as how often, when, and how to take the medication. As such, auxiliary labels are used for additional information that is not included in those directions for use printed on the label, or information which cannot fit on the prescription label itself due to limited space. Overall, auxiliary labels contain information intended to promote proper medication adherence through reminders about important information that will be seen anytime the bottle is picked up. They should be designed to be as simple as possible, written in plain language, and understandable for people with low health literacy.

Sometimes auxiliary labels are used not to add additional information to the packaging, but instead to reinforce information with a pictorial representation of the instructions for use. This may consist of a pictoral representation of the frequency of use, time of day to take, the administration route, or other information. Picture representations of directions can be useful for patients with low literacy, or who have trouble reading and comprehending text instructions due to age, eyesight, or language barriers.

As some medications must be stored under specific conditions (such as in original container with dessicant, or refrigerated), auxiliary labels may be used to reinforce these storage requirements to ensure it does not degrade through improper storage. Because some people may have difficulty swallowing medications whole, auxiliary labels may be used to provide advice on solutions, such as whether the medication can be chewed, crushed, or cut. Another use of auxiliary labels is important information on side effects or drug/food interactions.

A 2016 study found that many patients consider side effects to be important information to be included on a prescription package and that auxiliary labels are a good tool to provide this information on the packaging itself (as opposed to a separate information sheet/handout). The same study found that patients associated the use of red as a highlight color with information regarding warnings, allergies, or side effects.

== Usage ==
Deciding what auxiliary labels are suitable for a particular prescription requires knowledge of the drug's classification, interactions, and side effects. One study of auxiliary label usage found that about 80% of dispensed prescriptions would benefit from at least one auxiliary label to reinforce information, or provide additional important information aside from the directions for use. The most common auxiliary labels on prescriptions include "May cause drowsiness" and "alcohol may intensify the effect of this medication".

There is no standard for how to place auxiliary labels on a prescription, but they should be placed in a manner that they will be visible and intelligible in the normal course of medication usage. Auxiliary labels placed on a prescription vial may be placed vertically, horizontally, or on the vial cap, which is called "interactive placement". Placement of the label in an interactive manner where the patient must interact with it to open the vial increases the chance the label is noticed and considered by the patient. Both horizontal and interactive placement are superior to vertical placement, which is due to the need to rotate the vial to read the information on a vertically placed label. One study in 2007 found that 82% of prescriptions had auxiliary labels placed vertically, requiring the bottle to be tilted to read the text. The same study found a wide variation in coloring used on auxiliary labels from different pharmacies, and that between 8-25% of prescriptions filled had no warning labels at all.

The use of auxiliary labels does not substitute for pharmacist consultation about medications, nor for any supplemental medication guides or handouts recommended or required to be distributed with a drug. Auxiliary labels should only be used to remind or enhance instructions for use or warnings that have already been given by the pharmacist or doctor to the patient verbally.

== Effectiveness ==
Auxiliary labels can commonly be misinterpreted, especially when multi-step or multi-part instructions are present on one label. Misinterpretation of auxiliary labels can occur when patients are unable to understand the wording of the label, and thus assume an instruction based on the pictogram or color of the label. In addition to misinterpretation, some studies have found that most patients ignore auxiliary labels on prescriptions completely, especially those with low health literacy. This may be due in part to the belief that information presented on the bottle is not important, or due to the manner in which the labels are affixed to the vial. When auxiliary labels are used as a reminder to the patient of important information, failure to understand and follow the instructions from auxiliary labels can result in treatment failure or adverse effects. The effectiveness of auxiliary labels can vary greatly between different label formats and specific text, with a 2006 survey finding that one common multi-step, complex label ("Do not take dairy products, antacids, or iron preparations within 1 hour of this medication") was interpreted correctly only 7.6% of the time.

The overall effectiveness of auxiliary labels depends on the number of labels affixed, the design of the label, and their positioning on the medication package or vial. Simplifying the content and number of auxiliary labels can improve patient comprehension. In the United States, many labels are commonly only stocked in English, which can decrease the chance of understanding in areas with significant non-English speaking populations. Only one third of auxiliary labels in the United States are available in languages other than English.

Common elements considered to increase the chance of effectiveness of an auxiliary label include a single-step instruction, using easy-to-read text (for example, low Lexile score), use of clear, simple icons (if present), use of color to represent severity, and clarity of the instruction being represented. Font size and style, including boldface or capitalization patterns, can also impact the effectiveness of an auxiliary label. The effectiveness of auxiliary labels is also increased when pharmacists explicitly instruct patients on their presence on the package, and explain the importance of each of the warnings being presented using the auxiliary labels. It has also been recommended that people with low health literacy and low literacy in general be consulted during the design process for auxiliary labels to improve the chance for comprehension and effectiveness.
