= Complex partial status epilepticus =

- Specialty: Neurology

Complex partial status epilepticus (CPSE) is one of the non-convulsive forms of status epilepticus, a rare form of epilepsy defined by its recurrent nature. CPSE is characterized by seizures involving long-lasting stupor, staring and unresponsiveness. Sometimes this is accompanied by motor automatisms, such as eye twitching.

== Diagnosis ==
As is the case with other non-convulsive status epilepticus forms, CPSE is dangerously underdiagnosed. This is due to the potentially fatal yet veiled nature of the symptoms. Usually, an electroencephalogram, or EEG, is needed to confirm a neurologist's suspicions. The EEG is also needed to differentiate between absence status epilepticus (which affects the entire brain), and CPSE, which only affects one region.

== Treatment ==
Treatment is in the form of anti-epileptic drugs, such as barbiturates, benzodiazepines and topiramate.
