= HLA-B15 =

HLA-B serotype

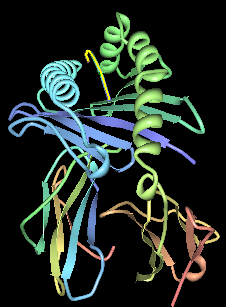
HLA-B*15:01 (alpha)-β2MG with bound peptide
major histocompatibility complex (human), class I, B15
Alleles	B*15:01, 15:02 . .
Structure (See HLA-B)
Shared data
Locus	chr.6 6p21.31

HLA-B15 (B15) is an HLA-B serotype. The serotype identifies the B*15 gene-allele protein products of HLA-B.

B15 is a broad antigen and can be subdivided into several split antigens that are often used in characterization. These are B62, B63, B70, B71, B72, B75, B76, B77. B*15 is the largest allele grouping for any known human autosomal locus, identified as of August 2008 there are more than 150 alleles and ~140 amino acid sequence variants from those gene products. Some of these alleles are discussed below. Other alleles, such as B*46 evolved from B*15. One reason for the diversity of this group is that B15 is among a group of alleles enriched in the original humans that left Africa and dispersed across East Asia and Australia. As people traveled east the frequency of many alleles dropped or disappeared from migrants. However B*15 persisted, expanded and diversified. The wide range and complex environment selected for new alleles and promoted their expansion. B*46 for example is not found in Africa, and appears to have evolved and spread in East Asia, to several 100 million bearers worldwide.

HLA-B15 allele *15:02 is associated with the severe skin conditions Stevens–Johnson syndrome (SJS) and toxic epidermal necrolysis (TEN) caused by carbamazepine drug sensitivity in East Asians.

Carriers of the HLA-B15 allele *15:01 (B62) are much more likely to be asymptomatic when infected with SARS-CoV-2 (the virus that causes COVID-19).

== Serotype ==
Serotypes B15, B62, B63, B70, B71, B72, B75, B76, B77 recognition of the HLA B*15 gene products
B*15	B15	B62	B63	B70	B71	B72	B75	B76	B77	Sample	Desig-
allele	%	%	%	%	%	%	%	%	%	size (N)	nation
*15:01	2	96								1906	B62
*15:02	7	22					62			1035	B75
*15:03	1			61		10				2569	B70
*15:04	10	69								29	B62
*15:05	18	64								22	B62
*15:06		40		20			11			10	B62
*15:07		79								101	B62
*15:08		20					18			45	B62
*15:09				53						65	B70
*15:10	1			49	2	2	1			1204	B70
*15:11	15	27					21			68	B62
*15:12	17	18						8		12	B62
*15:13	15	8	19				12		21	116	B77
*15:15	13	49					28			138	B62
*15:16	3		80							816	B63
*15:17	2		88							797	B63
*15:18				51	3					552	B70
*15:20		100								5	B62
*15:21	7	12					55			132	B75
*15:24		44								54	B62
*15:25	7	74					8			116	B62
*15:27	7	76								76	B62
*15:28	14	57					14			7	B62
*15:29				19						21	B70
*15:30	17	64								98	B62
*15:31		50								12	B62
*15:35		79								34	B62
*15:37				30						34	B70
Allele	B15	B62	B63	B70	B71	B72	B75	B76	B77	N
Alleles link-out to IPD-IMGT/HLA Database at EBI
