= HLA-B18 =

HLA-B serotype

major histocompatibility complex (human), class I, B18
Alleles	B*1801
Alleles	B*1802
Alleles	B*1803
Structure (See HLA-B)
Symbol(s)	HLA-B
EBI-HLA	B*1801
EBI-HLA	B*1802
EBI-HLA	B*1803
Locus	chr.6 6p21.31

HLA-B18 (B18) is an HLA-B serotype. The serotype identifies the more common HLA-B*18 gene products. (For terminology help see: HLA-serotype tutorial) B*1801, the most common allele is at highest frequencies in Northern Italy and the Balkans, a peak frequency distribution it shares with B*3501.

== Serotype ==
B*18:06 is one of the four B alleles that reacts with neither Bw4 nor Bw6. The others are B*46:01, B*55:03, and B*73:01.

B18 serotype recognition of Some HLA B*18 allele-group gene products
B*18	B18		Sample
allele	%	%	size (N)
1801	96		1641
1802	90		31
1803	83		29

== Allele frequencies ==
HLA B*1801 frequencies
		freq
ref.	Population	(%)
	Italy North pop 1	16.7
	Croatia	11.3
	Georgia Svaneti Svans	11.3
	Romanian	11.3
	Portugal South	11.2
	Singapore Riau Malay	9.9
	Bulgaria	9.1
	Israel Arab Druse	8.5
	Azores Central Islands	8.0
	Portugal Centre	8.0
	Finland	7.8
	Azores Santa Maria and Sao Miguel	7.7
	Czech Republic	7.5
	India Jalpaiguri Toto	7.5
	Iran Baloch	7.1
	Philippines Ivatan	7.0
	Thailand	6.7
	Tunisia	6.7
	Portugal North	6.5
	Zimbabwe Harare Shona	6.4
	Madeira	6.2
	Mexico Mestizos	6.1
	Kenya	5.9
	Belgium	5.1
	Morocco Nador Metalsa Class I	5.1
	Singapore Javanese Indonesians	5.1
	Israel Ashkenazi and Non Ashkenazi Jews	5.0
	Uganda Kampala	5.0
	Kenya Nandi	4.8
	Oman	4.7
	Georgia Tbilisi Georgians	4.6
	Bulgaria Gipsy	4.5
	France South East	4.3
	Kenya Luo	4.3
	Ireland South	4.2
	Russia Arkhangelsk Pomors	4.0
	Azores Terceira Island	3.9
	Guinea Bissau	3.8
	India New Delhi	3.8
	Spain Eastern Andalusia Gipsy	3.5
	Australia New South Wales	3.4
	Georgia Tbilisi Kurds	3.4
	Zambia Lusaka	3.4
	Cameroon Yaounde	2.7
	Senegal Niokholo Mandenka	2.7
	Cameroon Beti	2.3
	Ivory Coast Akan Adiopodoume	2.3
	Sudanese	2.3
	Saudi Arabia Guraiat and Hail	2.2
	South African Natal Zulu	2.0
	Thailand	2.0
	India Mumbai Marathas	1.9
	New Caledonia	1.9
	Papua New Guinea Wanigela	1.5
	Cameroon Bamileke	1.3
