= Phenytoin =

Anti-seizure medication

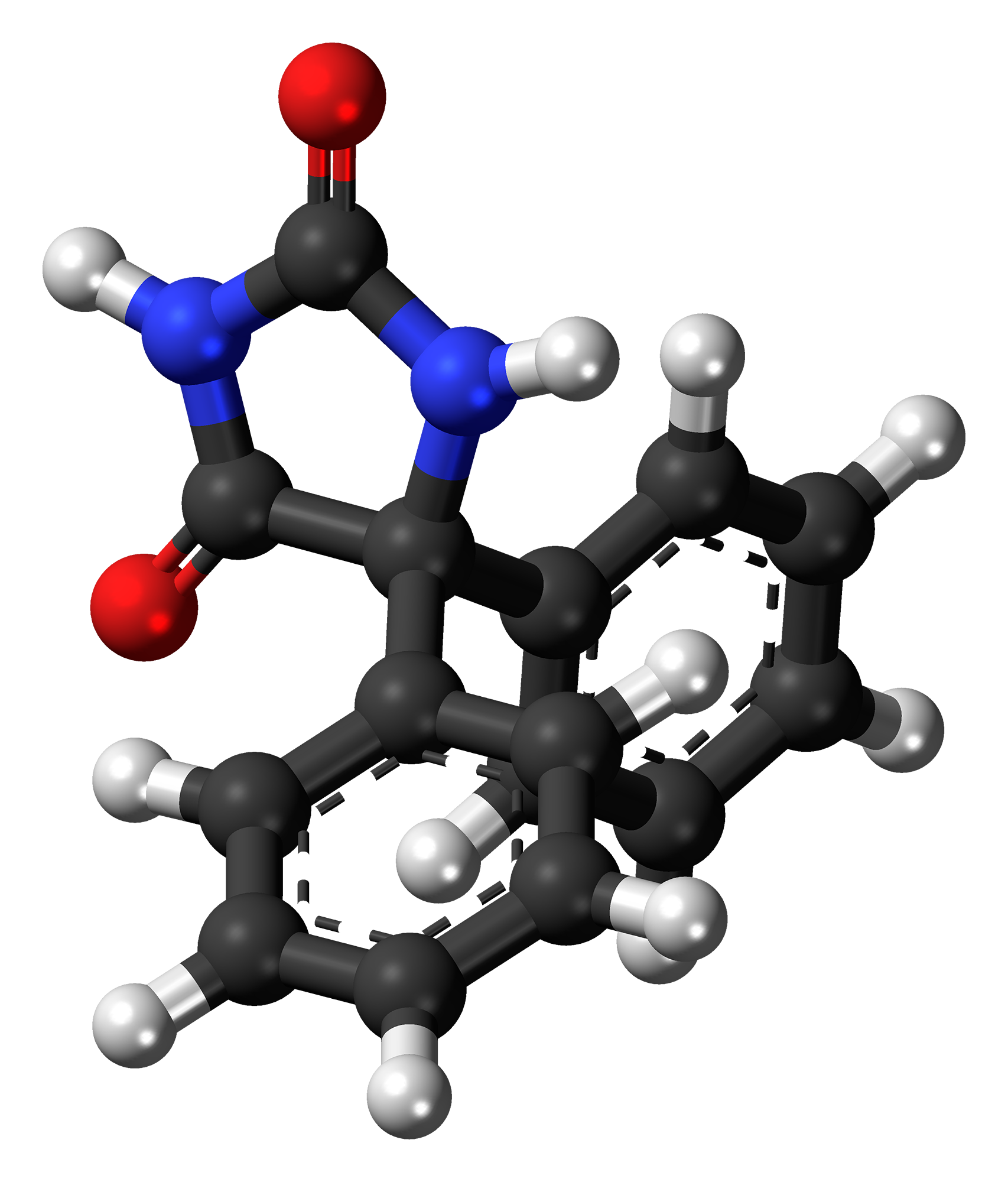

Clinical data
- Pronunciation: /fəˈnɪtoʊɪn, ˈfɛnɪtɔɪn/
- Trade names: Dilantin, others
- AHFS/Drugs.com: Monograph
- MedlinePlus: a682022
- License data: US DailyMed: Phenytoin
- Pregnancy category: AU: D; Toxic to reproduction
- Routes of administration: By mouth, intravenous
- Drug class: Anticonvulsant; Antiarrhythmic agent
- ATC code: N03AB02 (WHO)

Legal status
- Legal status: AU: S4 (Prescription only); BR: Class C1 (Other controlled substances); CA: ℞-only; UK: POM (Prescription only); US: ℞-only

Pharmacokinetic data
- Bioavailability: 70–100% (oral), 24.4% (rectal)
- Protein binding: 95%
- Metabolism: Liver
- Onset of action: 10–30 min (intravenous)
- Elimination half-life: 10–22 hours
- Duration of action: 24 hours
- Excretion: Urinary (23–70%), bile

Identifiers
- IUPAC name: 5,5-diphenylimidazolidine-2,4-dione
- CAS Number: 57-41-0
- PubChem CID: 1775
- IUPHAR/BPS: 2624
- DrugBank: DB00252
- ChemSpider: 1710
- UNII: 6158TKW0C5
- KEGG: D00512
- ChEBI: CHEBI:8107
- ChEMBL: ChEMBL16
- CompTox Dashboard (EPA): DTXSID8020541
- ECHA InfoCard: 100.000.298

Chemical and physical data
- Formula: C_{15}H_{12}N_{2}O_{2}
- Molar mass: 252.273 g·mol^{−1}
- 3D model (JSmol): Interactive image
- SMILES: C1=CC=C(C=C1)C2(C(=O)NC(=O)N2)C3=CC=CC=C3
- InChI: InChI=1S/C15H12N2O2/c18-13-15(17-14(19)16-13,11-7-3-1-4-8-11)12-9-5-2-6-10-12/h1-10H,(H2,16,17,18,19); Key:CXOFVDLJLONNDW-UHFFFAOYSA-N

Phenytoin, originally sold as the patent drug Dilantin and now available under other brand names, is an anti-seizure medication. It is useful for the prevention of tonic–clonic seizures (also known as grand mal seizures) and focal seizures, but not absence seizures. The intravenous form, fosphenytoin, is used for status epilepticus that does not improve with benzodiazepines. It may also be used for certain heart arrhythmias or neuropathic pain. It can be taken intravenously or by mouth. The intravenous form generally begins working within 30 minutes and is effective for roughly 24 hours. Blood levels can be measured to determine the proper dose.

Common side effects include nausea, stomach pain, loss of appetite, poor coordination, increased hair growth, and enlargement of the gums. Potentially serious side effects include sleepiness, self harm, liver problems, bone marrow suppression, low blood pressure, toxic epidermal necrolysis, and atrophy of the cerebellum. There is evidence that use during pregnancy results in abnormalities in the baby. It appears to be safe to use when breastfeeding. Alcohol may interfere with the medication's effects.

Phenytoin was first made in 1908 by the German chemist Heinrich Biltz and found useful for seizures in 1936. It is on the World Health Organization's List of Essential Medicines. Phenytoin is available as a generic medication.

Phenytoin has not appeared on the list of the 300 most commonly prescribed medications in the United States since 2020, when it was the 260th most commonly prescribed medication in the United States.

== Medical uses ==
=== Seizures ===
- Tonic–clonic seizures: Mainly used in the prophylactic management of tonic–clonic seizures with complex symptomatology (psychomotor seizures). A period of 5–10 days of dosing may be required to achieve anticonvulsant effects.
- Focal seizures: Mainly used to protect against the development of focal seizures with complex symptomatology (psychomotor and temporal lobe seizures). Also effective in controlling focal seizures with autonomic symptoms.
- Absence seizures: Not used in treatment of pure absence seizures due to risk for increasing frequency of seizures. However, can be used in combination with other anticonvulsants during combined absence and tonic–clonic seizures.
- Seizures during surgery: A 2018 meta-analysis found that early antiepileptic treatment with either phenytoin or phenobarbital reduced the risk of seizure in the first week after neurosurgery for brain tumors.
- Status epilepticus: Considered after failed treatment using a benzodiazepine due to slow onset of action.

Though phenytoin has been used to treat seizures in infants, as of 2023, its effectiveness in this age group has been evaluated in only one study. Due to the lack of a comparison group, the evidence is inconclusive.

=== Other ===
- Abnormal heart rhythms: may be used in the treatment of ventricular tachycardia and sudden episodes of atrial tachycardia after other antiarrhythmic medications or cardioversion has failed. It is a class Ib antiarrhythmic.
- Digoxin toxicity: Intravenous phenytoin formulation is a medication of choice for arrhythmias caused by cardiac glycoside toxicity.
- Trigeminal neuralgia: Second choice drug to carbamazepine.

=== Special considerations ===
- Phenytoin has a narrow therapeutic index. Its therapeutic range for both anticonvulsant and antiarrhythmic effect is 10–20 μg/mL.
- Avoid giving intramuscular formulation unless necessary due to skin cell death and local tissue destruction.
- Elderly patients may show earlier signs of toxicity.
- In the obese, ideal body weight should be used for dosing calculations.
- Pregnancy: Pregnancy category D due to risk of fetal hydantoin syndrome and fetal bleeding. However, optimal seizure control is very important during pregnancy so drug may be continued if benefits outweigh the risks. Due to decreased drug concentrations as a result of plasma volume expansion during pregnancy, dose of phenytoin may need to be increased if only option for seizure control.
- Breastfeeding: The manufacturer does not recommend breastfeeding since low concentrations of phenytoin are excreted in breast milk.
- Liver disease: Do not use oral loading dose. Consider using decreased maintenance dose.
- Kidney disease: Do not use oral loading dose. Can begin with standard maintenance dose and adjust as needed.
- Intravenous use is contraindicated in patients with sinus bradycardia, sinoatrial block, second- or third-degree atrioventricular block, Stokes-Adams syndrome, or hypersensitivity to phenytoin, other hydantoins or any ingredient in the respective formulation.

== Side effects ==
Common side effects include nausea, stomach pain, loss of appetite, poor coordination, increased hair growth, and enlargement of the gums. Potentially serious side effects include sleepiness, self harm, liver problems, bone marrow suppression, low blood pressure, and toxic epidermal necrolysis. There is evidence that use during pregnancy results in abnormalities in the baby. Its use appears to be safe during breastfeeding. Alcohol may interfere with the medication's effects.

=== Heart and blood vessels ===
Severe low blood pressure and abnormal heart rhythms can be seen with rapid infusion of IV phenytoin. IV infusion should not exceed 50 mg/min in adults or 1–3 mg/kg/min (or 50 mg/min, whichever is slower) in children. Heart monitoring should occur during and after IV infusion. Due to these risks, oral phenytoin should be used if possible.

=== Neurological ===
At therapeutic doses, phenytoin may produce nystagmus on lateral gaze. At toxic doses, patients experience vertical nystagmus, double vision, sedation, slurred speech, cerebellar ataxia, and tremor. If phenytoin is stopped abruptly, this may result in increased seizure frequency, including status epilepticus.

Phenytoin may accumulate in the cerebral cortex over long periods of time which can cause atrophy of the cerebellum. The degree of atrophy is related to the duration of phenytoin treatment and is not related to dosage of the medication.

Phenytoin is known to be a causal factor in the development of peripheral neuropathy.

=== Blood ===
Folate is present in food in a polyglutamate form, which is then converted into monoglutamates by intestinal conjugase to be absorbed by the jejunum. Phenytoin acts by inhibiting this enzyme, thereby causing folate deficiency, and thus megaloblastic anemia. Other side effects may include: agranulocytosis, aplastic anemia, decreased white blood cell count, and a low platelet count.

=== Pregnancy ===
Phenytoin is a known teratogen, since children exposed to phenytoin are at a higher risk of birth defects than children born to women without epilepsy and to women with untreated epilepsy. The birth defects, which occur in approximately 6% of exposed children, include neural tube defects, heart defects and craniofacial abnormalities, including broad nasal bridge, cleft lip and palate, and smaller than normal head. The effect on IQ cannot be determined as no study involves phenytoin as monotherapy, however poorer language abilities and delayed motor development may have been associated with maternal use of phenytoin during pregnancy. This syndrome resembles the well-described fetal alcohol syndrome. and has been referred to as "fetal hydantoin syndrome". Some recommend avoiding polytherapy and maintaining the minimal dose possible during pregnancy, but acknowledge that current data fails to demonstrate a dose effect on the risk of birth defects. Data now being collected by the Epilepsy and Antiepileptic Drug Pregnancy Registry may one day answer this question definitively.

=== Cancer ===
There is no good evidence to suggest that phenytoin is a human carcinogen. However, lymph node abnormalities have been observed, including malignancies.

=== Mouth ===
Phenytoin has been associated with drug-induced gingival enlargement (overgrowth of the gums), probably due to above-mentioned folate deficiency; indeed, evidence from a randomized controlled trial suggests that folic acid supplementation can prevent gingival enlargement in children who take phenytoin. Plasma concentrations needed to induce gingival lesions have not been clearly defined. Effects consist of the following: bleeding upon probing, increased gingival exudate, pronounced gingival inflammatory response to plaque levels, associated in some instances with bone loss but without tooth detachment.

=== Skin ===
Hypertrichosis, Stevens–Johnson syndrome, purple glove syndrome, rash, exfoliative dermatitis, itching, excessive hairiness, and coarsening of facial features can be seen in those taking phenytoin.

Phenytoin therapy has been linked to the life-threatening skin reactions Stevens–Johnson syndrome (SJS) and toxic epidermal necrolysis (TEN). These conditions are significantly more common in patients with a particular HLA-B allele, HLA-B*1502. This allele occurs almost exclusively in patients with ancestry across broad areas of Asia, including South Asian Indians.

Phenytoin is primarily metabolized to its inactive form by the enzyme CYP2C9. Variations within the CYP2C9 gene that result in decreased enzymatic activity have been associated with increased phenytoin concentrations, as well as reports of drug toxicities due to these increased concentrations. The U.S. Food and Drug Administration (FDA) notes on the phenytoin drug label that since strong evidence exists linking HLA-B*1502 with the risk of developing SJS or TEN in patients taking carbamazepine, consideration should be given to avoiding phenytoin as an alternative to carbamazepine in patients carrying this allele.

=== Immune system ===
Phenytoin has been known to cause drug-induced lupus.

Phenytoin is also associated with induction of reversible IgA deficiency.

=== Psychological ===
Phenytoin may increase risk of suicidal thoughts or behavior. People on phenytoin should be monitored for any changes in mood, the development or worsening depression, and/or any thoughts or behavior of suicide.

=== Bones ===
Chronic phenytoin use has been associated with decreased bone density and increased bone fractures. Phenytoin induces metabolizing enzymes in the liver. This leads to increased metabolism of vitamin D, thus decreased vitamin D levels. Vitamin D deficiency, as well as low calcium and phosphate in the blood cause decreased bone mineral density.

== Interactions ==
Phenytoin is an inducer of the CYP3A4 and CYP2C9 families of the P450 enzyme responsible for the liver's degradation of various drugs.

A 1981 study by the National Institutes of Health showed that antacids administered concomitantly with phenytoin "altered not only the extent of absorption but also appeared to alter the rate of absorption. Antacids administered in a peptic ulcer regimen may decrease the AUC of a single dose of phenytoin. Patients should be cautioned against concomitant use of antacids and phenytoin."

Warfarin and trimethoprim increase serum phenytoin levels and prolong the serum half-life of phenytoin by inhibiting its metabolism. Consider using other options if possible.

In general, phenytoin can interact with the following drugs:

- Antidepressant drugs
- Antifungal drugs such as fluconazole, ketoconazole
- antibiotics such as metronidazole, chloramphenicol, clarithromycin, azithromycin
- Cortones (such as betamethasone, dexamethasone, hydrocortisone and prednisolone
- L-DOPA (phenytoin can cause the beneficial effect of levodopa to disappear.)

== Pharmacology ==
=== Mechanism of action ===
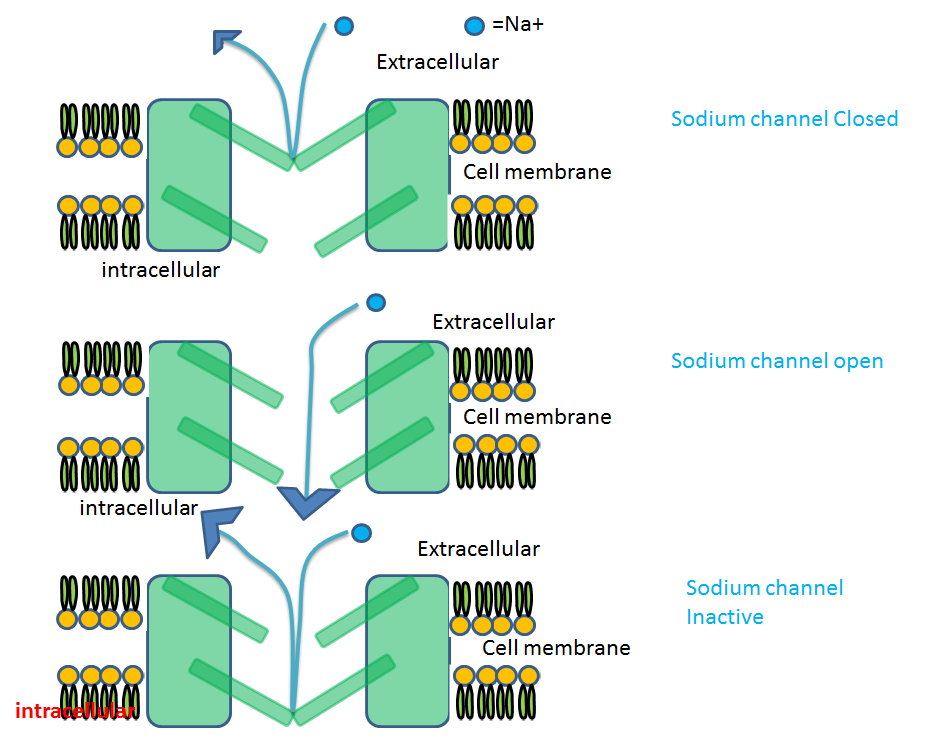
The mechanism of action of phenytoin sodium. Sodium channels are: 1) Closed 2) Open 3) Inactive (phenytoin effect)

Phenytoin is believed to protect against seizures by causing voltage-dependent block of voltage gated sodium channels. This blocks sustained high frequency repetitive firing of action potentials. This is accomplished by reducing the amplitude of sodium-dependent action potentials through enhancing steady-state inactivation. Sodium channels exist in three main conformations: the resting state, the open state, and the inactive state.

Phenytoin binds preferentially to the inactive form of the sodium channel. Because it takes time for the bound drug to dissassociate from the inactive channel, there is a time-dependent block of the channel. Since the fraction of inactive channels is increased by membrane depolarization as well as by repetitive firing, the binding to the inactive state by phenytoin sodium can produce voltage-dependent, use-dependent and time-dependent block of sodium-dependent action potentials.

The primary site of action appears to be the motor cortex where spread of seizure activity is inhibited. Possibly by promoting sodium efflux from neurons, phenytoin tends to stabilize the threshold against hyperexcitability caused by excessive stimulation or environmental changes capable of reducing membrane sodium gradient. This includes the reduction of post-tetanic potentiation at synapses which prevents cortical seizure foci from detonating adjacent cortical areas. Phenytoin reduces the maximal activity of brain stem centers responsible for the tonic phase of generalized tonic–clonic seizures.

=== Pharmacokinetics ===
Phenytoin elimination kinetics show mixed-order, non-linear elimination behaviour at therapeutic concentrations. Where phenytoin is at low concentration it is cleared by first order kinetics, and at high concentrations by zero order kinetics. A small increase in dose may lead to a large increase in drug concentration as elimination becomes saturated. The time to reach steady state is often longer than 2 weeks.

== History ==
Phenytoin (diphenylhydantoin) was first synthesized by German chemist Heinrich Biltz in 1908. Biltz sold his discovery to Parke-Davis, which did not find an immediate use for it. In 1938, other physicians, including H. Houston Merritt and Tracy Putnam, discovered phenytoin's usefulness for controlling seizures, without the sedative effects associated with phenobarbital.

According to Goodman and Gilman's Pharmacological Basis of Therapeutics:

In contrast to the earlier accidental discovery of the antiseizure properties of potassium bromide and phenobarbital, phenytoin was the product of a search among nonsedative structural relatives of phenobarbital for agents capable of suppressing electroshock convulsions in laboratory animals.

It was approved by the FDA in 1953 for use in seizures.

Jack Dreyfus, founder of the Dreyfus Fund, became a major proponent of phenytoin as a means to control nervousness and depression when he received a prescription for Dilantin in 1966. He has claimed to have supplied large amounts of the drug to Richard Nixon throughout the late 1960s and early 1970s, although this is disputed by former White House aides and Presidential historians. Dreyfus' experience with phenytoin is outlined in his book, A Remarkable Medicine Has Been Overlooked. Despite more than $70 million in personal financing, his push to see phenytoin evaluated for alternative uses has had little lasting effect on the medical community. This was partially because Parke-Davis was reluctant to invest in a drug nearing the end of its patent life, and partially due to mixed results from various studies.

In 2008, the drug was put on the FDA's Potential Signals of Serious Risks List to be further evaluated for approval. The list identifies medications with which the FDA has identified potential safety issues, but has not yet identified a causal relationship between the drug and the listed risk. To address this concern, the Warnings and Precautions section of the labeling for Dilantin injection was updated to include additional information about Purple glove syndrome in November 2011.

== Society and culture ==
=== Economics ===
Phenytoin is available as a generic medication.

Since September 2012, the marketing licence in the UK has been held by Flynn Pharma Ltd, of Dublin, Ireland, and the product, although identical, has been called Phenytoin Sodium xxmg Flynn Hard Capsules. (The xxmg in the name refers to the strength—for example "Phenytoin sodium 25 mg Flynn Hard Capsules"). The capsules are still made by Pfizer's Goedecke subsidiary's plant in Freiburg, Germany, and they still have Epanutin printed on them.

After Pfizer's sale of the UK marketing licence to Flynn Pharma, the price of a 28-pack of 25 mg phenytoin sodium capsules marked Epanutin rose from 66p (about $0.88) to £15.74 (about $25.06). Capsules of other strengths also went up in price by the same factor—2,384%, costing the UK's National Health Service an extra £43 million (about $68.44 million) a year. The companies were referred to the Competition and Markets Authority (CMA) who found that they had exploited their dominant position in the market to charge "excessive and unfair" prices.

The CMA imposed a record £84.2 million fine on the manufacturer Pfizer, and a £5.2 million fine on the distributor Flynn Pharma and ordered the companies to reduce their prices.

=== Brand names ===
Phenytoin is marketed under many brand names worldwide.

In the US, Dilantin is marketed by Viatris after Upjohn was spun off from Pfizer.

== Research ==
Tentative evidence suggests that topical phenytoin is useful in wound healing in people with chronic skin wounds.

A meta-analysis has also supported the use of phenytoin in managing various ulcers.

Phenytoin is incorporated into compounded medications to optimize wound treatment, often in combination with misoprostol.

Some clinical trials have explored whether phenytoin can be used for neuroprotection purposes in the treatment of multiple sclerosis.
