= HLA-B75 =

Human leukocyte antigen serotype

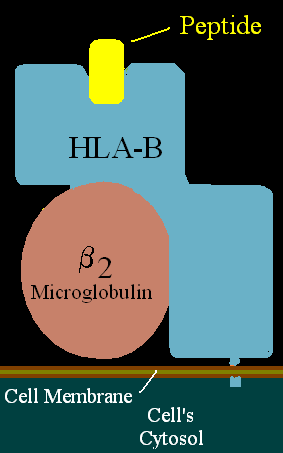
HLA-B (alpha)-β2MG with bound peptide
major histocompatibility complex (human), class I, B75
Alleles	B*1513
Structure (See HLA-B)
Shared data
Locus	chr.6 6p21.31

HLA-B75 (B75) is an HLA-B serotype. The serotype identifies certain B*15 gene-allele protein products of HLA-B.

B75 is one of many split antigens of the broad antigen, B15. B75 (B*1502) is associated with a severe drug-induced skin condition in ethnic East Asians.

== Serotype ==
Serotypes B15, B62, B63, B70, B71, B72, B75, B76, B77 recognition of the HLA-B*15 gene products
B*15	B15	B62	B63	B70	B71	B72	B75	B76	B77	Sample
allele	%	%	%	%	%	%	%	%	%	size (N)
*1502	7	22					62			1035
*1521	7	12					55			132
Alleles link-out to IMGT/HLA Database at EBI

== Alleles ==
HLA B*1502 frequencies
		freq
ref.	Population	(%)
	Philippines Ivatan	22.0
	Taiwan Puyuma	18.0
	China Guangxi Maonan	14.8
	China Yunnan Lisu	12.3
	Taiwan Tao	12.0
	Singapore Chinese Han	11.6
	China Guangzhou	11.0
	Hong Kong Chinese	10.2
	China Yunnan Nu	9.0
	Singapore Riau Malay	8.4
	Singapore Javanese Indonesians	8.2
	Thailand (3)	8.2
	China South Han	7.1
	Singapore Thai	6.1
	India Khandesh Pawra	6.0
	Taiwan Minnan pop 1	5.9
	Singapore Chinese	5.7
	India West Bhils	4.0
	Taiwan Pazeh	3.6
	China Guangdong Meizhou Han	3.5
	South Africa Natal Tamil	3.1
	China Qinghai Hui	2.7
	Taiwan Hakka	2.7
	Shijiazhuang Tianjian Han	2.4
	China North Han	1.9
	India Mumbai Marathas	1.9
	India North Delhi	1.6
	China Beijing	1.5
	China Inner Mongolia	1.5
	American Samoa	1.0
	India North Hindus	1.0
	Taiwan Siraya	1.0
	Taiwan Tsou	1.0
	Ingig. Australian Groote Eylandt	0.7
	United Arab Emirates	0.6

HLA B*1521 frequencies
		freq
ref.	Population	(%)
	Indig. Australian Cape York Penin.	13.5
	Indig. Australian Yuendumu	12.4
	PNG Eastern Highlands Goroka	7.1
	Ind. Australian Groote Eylandt	6.0
	New Caledonia	5.8
	Singapore Riau Malay	4.0
	American Samoa	3.0
	Australian Aborigine Kimberly	2.6
	PNG Karimui Plateau	2.5
	Singapore Javanese Indonesians	2.0
	Papua New Guinea Wanigela	1.5
	USA Asian	1.4
	Philippines Ivatan	1.0
	Thailand (3)	1.0
	Taiwan Hakka	0.9

== Diseases ==
HLA-B*1502 is associated with carbamazepine and phenytoin–induced Stevens–Johnson syndrome in Chinese and Thai people. One study showed a 100% association between B*1502 and the drug-induced skin disorder in a Chinese population. In Europe the B*1502 positive patients are only found in this syndrome of persons of East Asian descent, however B58 confers susceptibility to both groups but to a lesser degree and is sensitive to allopurinol.
