= HLA-B70 =

Human leukocyte antigen serotype

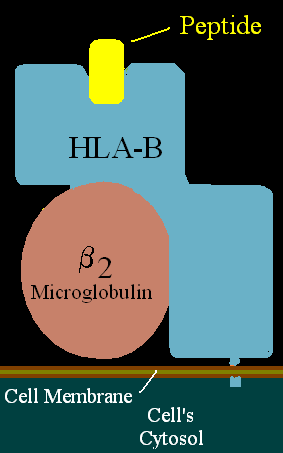
HLA-B (alpha)-β2MG with bound peptide
major histocompatibility complex (human), class I, B70
Alleles	*1503, *1509, *1510, *1518, *1529, *1537
Structure (See HLA-B)
Shared data
Locus	chr.6 6p21.31

HLA-B70 (B70) is an HLA-B serotype. The serotype identifies certain B*15 gene-allele protein products of HLA-B. B70 is one of many split antigens of the broad antigen, B15.

== Serotype ==
Serotypes B15, B62, B63, B70, B71, B72, B75, B76, B77 recognition of the HLA B*15 gene products
B*15	B15	B62	B63	B70	B71	B72	B75	B76	B77	Sample
allele	%	%	%	%	%	%	%	%	%	size (N)
*1503	1			61		10				2569
*1509				53						65
*1510	1			49	2	2	1			1204
*1518				51	3					552
*1529				19						21
*1537				30						34
Alleles link-out to IMGT/HLA Databease at EBI

== Alleles ==
HLA B*1503 frequencies
		freq
ref.	Population	(%)
	Burkina Faso Rimaibe	13.8
	Guinea Bissau	10.8
	Cameroon Pygmy Baka	10.0
	South African Natal Zulu	9.5
	Kenya Luo	8.9
	Ivory Coast Akan Adiopodoume	8.0
	Kenya Nandi	7.9
	Cameroon Sawa	7.7
	Zimbabwe Harare Shona	7.7
	USA African America	7.3
	Burkina Faso Fulani	7.1
	Mali Bandiagara	6.9
	Senegal Niokholo Mandenka	6.9
	Cape Verde SE Islands	6.5
	Kenya	6.3
	Uganda Kampala	6.2
	Sudanese	6.0
	Zambia Lusaka	5.7
	Cameroon Yaounde	4.9
	Cape Verde NW Islands	4.8
	Oman	4.7
	Cameroon Bamileke	4.5
	Tunisia Tunis	4.5
	Cameroon Beti	3.7
	Brazil Belo Horizonte	3.2
	Azores Terceira Island	2.4
	Madeira	2.2
	Saudi Arabia Guraiat and Hail	2.0
	Tunisia	2.0
	United Arab Emerates	1.5
	Brazil	1.4
	Cuban White	1.4
	Morocco Nador Metalsa	1.4
	Mexico Mestizos	1.2
	Italy Bergamo	1.1
	Portugal North	1.1
	American Samoa	1.0
	Iran Baloch	1.0
	Mexico Guadalajara Mestizos (2)	1.0
	Azores Central Islands	0.9
	Israel Ashk. and Non-Ashk. Jews	0.9
	Taiwan Hakka	0.9
	Croatia	0.7

HLA B*1509 frequencies
		freq
ref.	Population	(%)
	Burkina Faso Fulani	4.1
	India West Coast Parsis	3.0
	Spain Eastern Andalusia Gipsy	3.0
	Mexico Mestizos	2.4
	Italy South Campania	1.2
	Burkina Faso Rimaibe	1.1
	China Inner Mongolia	1.0
	Mali Bandiagara	0.7
	Czech Republic	0.5

HLA B*1510 frequencies
		freq
ref.	Population	(%)
	South African Natal Zulu	8.5
	Zimbabwe Harare Shona	8.4
	Ivory Coast Akan Adiopodoume	5.7
	Kenya	5.2
	Zambia Lusaka	4.6
	Cameroon Sawa	3.8
	Guinea Bissau	3.8
	Kenya Luo	3.6
	Senegal Niokholo Mandenka	3.2
	Cameroon Beti	2.8
	USA African Americans (3)	2.7
	Uganda Kampala	2.5
	Mexico Mestizos	2.4
	Mali Bandiagara	2.2
	Kenya Nandi	1.7
	Brazil Belo Horizonte	1.6
	Cameroon Bamileke	1.3
	Cuban Mulatto	1.2
	Cameroon Yaounde	1.1
	Iran Baloch	1.0
	Sudanese	1.0
	Tunisia	1.0
	Brazil Terena	0.9
	Cape Verde NW Islands	0.8
	United Arab Emerates	0.8
	USA North American Natives	0.8
	Guadalajara Mestizos (2)	0.5

HLA B*1518 frequencies
		freq
ref.	Population	(%)
	South Africa Natal Tamil	4.1
	Autonomous Tibetans	3.8
	India Mumbai Marathas	3.7
	China North Han	2.9
	USA Hawaii Okinawa	2.9
	China Guangzhou Han	2.4
	India Andhra Pradesh Golla	2.4
	China Beijing	2.3
	Taiwan Hakka	1.8
	Japan	1.7
	India North Delhi	1.6
	China Inner Mongolia	1.5
	China Qinghai Hui	1.4
	Czech Republic	1.4
	China Yunnan Nu	1.3
	Shijiazhuang Tianjian Han	1.1
	Ivory Coast Akan Adiopodoume	1.1
	Senegal Niokholo Mandenka	1.1
	Zambia Lusaka	1.1
	Portugal Centre	1.0
	Singapore Javanese Indonesians	1.0
	Thailand (3)	1.0
	South Korea (3)	0.9
	Cape Verde Islands	0.8
	France South East	0.8
	Guinea Bissau	0.8
	China South Han	0.7
	China Yunnan Lisu	0.7
	Russia Tuva (2)	0.6
	Singapore Chinese Han	0.6
	Spain Eastern Andalusia	0.6
