= HLA-B63 =

Human leukocyte antigen serotype

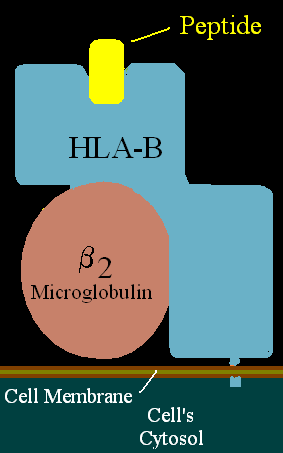
HLA-B (alpha)-β2MG with bound peptide
major histocompatibility complex (human), class I, B63
Alleles	*1516, *1517
Structure (See HLA-B)
Shared data
Locus	chr.6 6p21.31

HLA-B63 (B63) is an HLA-B serotype. The serotype identifies certain B*15 gene-allele protein products of HLA-B.

B63 is one of many split antigens of the broad antigen, B15. B63 identifies the B*1516 and B*1517 allele products.

== Serotype ==
Serotypes B15, B62, B63, B70, B71, B72, B75, B76, B77 recognition of the HLA B*15 gene products
B*15	B15	B62	B63	B70	B71	B72	B75	B76	B77	Sample
allele	%	%	%	%	%	%	%	%	%	size (N)
*1516	3		80							816
*1517	2		88							797
Alleles link-out to IMGT/HLA Databease at EBI

== Alleles ==
HLA B*1516 frequencies
		freq
ref.	Population	(%)
	Ivory Coast Akan Adiopodoume	4.6
	Cameroon Bamileke	3.2
	USA African Americans (3)	1.9
	Italy South Campania	1.6
	United Arab Emerates	1.5
	Brazil	1.4
	Azores S. Maria and S. Miguel	1.3
	Zimbabwe Harare Shona	1.3
	Cameroon Beti	1.1
	Cameroon Yaounde	1.1
	Mali Bandiagara	1.1
	Tunisia Tunis	1.1
	Kenya Nandi	1.0
	Cape Verde SE Islands	0.8
	Kenya	0.7
	Uganda Kampala	0.6
	Brazil Belo Horizonte	0.5
	South African Natal Zulu	0.5
	Sudanese	0.5
	Tunisia	0.5
	Kenya Luo	0.4
	Oman	0.4

HLA B*1517 frequencies
		freq
ref.	Population	(%)
	India Khandesh Pawra	9.0
	South Africa Natal Tamil	3.1
	Saudi Arabia Guraiat and Hail	2.7
	Mexico Zaptotec Oaxaca	2.2
	India North Hindus	1.9
	Bulgaria	1.8
	India North Delhi	1.6
	China Inner Mongolia	1.5
	Georgia Tbilisi Georgians	1.4
	Kenya Luo	1.3
	Cuban Mulatto	1.2
	Brazil Belo Horizonte	1.1
	Cameroon Yaounde	1.1
	Portugal North	1.1
	Tunisia Tunis	1.1
	Kenya Nandi	1.0
	Portugal Centre	1.0
	China Qinghai Hui	0.9
	Israel Ashk. and Non Ashk.i Jews	0.9
	Azores Terceira Island	0.8
	Cape Verde Southeastern Islands	0.8
	France South East	0.8
	India New Delhi	0.8
	Russia Tuva pop 2	0.8
	Sudanese	0.8
	USA African Americans pop3	0.8
	USA Caucasian pop2	0.8
	Brazil	0.7
	Cuban White	0.7
	Thailand	0.7
	USA Philadelphia Caucasians	0.7
	Cameroon Beti	0.6
	Romanian	0.6
	Czech Republic	0.5
	Singapore Thai	0.5
	Spain Eastern Andalusia Gipsy	0.5
