= Purple glove syndrome =

- Specialty: Dermatology

Purple glove syndrome (PGS) is a poorly understood skin disease in which the extremities become swollen, discoloured and painful. PGS is potentially serious and may require amputation. PGS is most common among elderly patients and those receiving multiple large intravenous doses of the epilepsy drug phenytoin. Compartment syndrome is a complication of PGS.

== Cause ==
Purple glove syndrome is caused by the intravenous anticonvulsant phenytoin. This medication has many already established neurological side effects. However, glove syndrome is a rare, with incidence ranging from 1.7% to 5.9%, but has very serious adverse effect that may lead to limb amputations. This may occur due to the administration of phenytoin with or without extravasation. The defining characteristic is a purplish to black discoloration of the extremity followed by peripheral edema and pain distal to the site of infusion. Onset is generally seen within two and twelve hours of administration. The true pathology of purple glove syndrome is not fully elucidated, however it is believed to be due to the crystallization of phenytoin within the blood and extravasates into the surrounding interstitium. Another mechanism may be due to the disruption of endothelial transcellular junctions followed by leaking of phenytoin into the surround soft tissues.

== Diagnosis ==
A diagnosis is usually made if symptoms of PSG appear after a dosage of phenytoin, especially if symptoms such as edema are near the injection site.

== Treatment ==
Doctors recommend discontinuing the use of phenytoin. The application of heat can help to relieve pain. Limb elevation, compression, and massage are also often used to relieve symptoms. Oral phenytoin can also result in development of purple glove syndrome.
