= HLA-B77 =

Human leukocyte antigen serotype

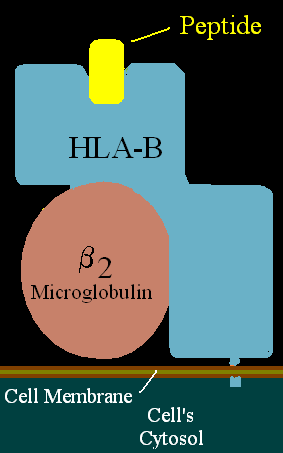
HLA-B (alpha)-β2MG with bound peptide
major histocompatibility complex (human), class I, B77
Alleles	B*1513
Structure (See HLA-B)
Shared data
Locus	chr.6 6p21.31

HLA-B77 (B77) is an HLA-B serotype. The serotype identifies certain B*15 gene-allele protein products of HLA-B.

B77 is a split antigen of the broad antigen B15.

== Serotype ==
Serotypes B15, B62, B63, B70, B71, B72, B75, B76, B77 recognition of the HLA B*15 gene products
B*15	B15	B62	B63	B70	B71	B72	B75	B76	B77	Sample
allele	%	%	%	%	%	%	%	%	%	size (N)
*1513	15	8	19				12		21	116
Alleles link-out to IMGT/HLA Databease at EBI
