= HLA-B73 =

Human leukocyte antigen serotype

major histocompatibility complex (human), class I, B73
Alleles	B*7301
Structure (See HLA-B)
Symbol(s)	HLA-B
EBI-HLA	B*7301
Locus	chr.6 6p21.31

HLA-B73 (B73) is an HLA-B serotype. The serotype identifies the HLA-B*7301 gene product. Part of B*7301 is similar to the HLA-B22 family, however part resembles the domains seen in other apes. B73 is more common in Western Indian Ocean, Mediterranean and Africa. (For terminology help see: HLA-serotype tutorial)

== Serotype ==
B*73:01 is one of the four B alleles that reacts with neither Bw4 nor Bw6. The others are B*18:06, B*46:01, and B*55:03.

B73 serotype recognition of B*7301 allele-group gene products
B*73	B73	Other	Sample
allele	%	%	size (N)
7301	22	69	106

== B*7301 frequencies ==
HLA B*7301 frequencies
		freq
ref.	Population	(%)
	Parsi (Karachi, Pakistan)	4.9
	United Arab Emirates	2.0
	Italy	2.0
	Seri (Sonora, Mexico)	1.5
	Purépecha (Michoacán, Mexico)	1.5
	Jews (Israel) (*2 studies)	1.2
	Beti (Cameroon)	1.1
	Casablanca (Morocco)	0.9
	Tbilisi (Georgia)	0.9
	Mossi (Burkina Faso)	0.9
	Bulgaria	0.9
	Sudanese	0.8
	Tuva (Russia) (2)	0.8
	Oman	0.8
	Bamileke (Cameroon)	0.6
	Pathan (Pakistan)	0.5
	Khalkha (Mongolia)	0.5
	Druse Arabs (Israel)	0.5
	Baloch (Iran)	0.5
	Manchester (England)	0.5
	Algeria (1)	0.5
	Turkey	0.4
	Amman (Jordan)	0.3
	Shona (Harare, Zimbabwe)	0.2
	Republic of Macedonia	0.2
	Nandi (Kenya)	0.2
	Luo (Kenya)	0.2
	Campania (Italy)	0.2
	Greece	0.2
