= HLA-B62 =

Human leukocyte antigen serotype

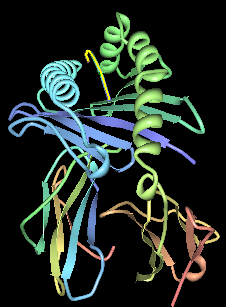
HLA-B62 with bound peptide
major histocompatibility complex (human), class I, B62
| Alleles | *1501, *1504, *1507, *1525 |
Structure (See HLA-B)
Shared data
| Locus | chr.6 6p21.31 |

HLA-B62 (B62) is an HLA-B serotype. The serotype identifies certain B*15 gene-allele protein products of HLA-B.

B62 is the largest of many split antigens of the broad antigen, B15. B62 best identifies the B*1501, B*1504, B*1507 B*1525 and B*1533 allele products.

== Serotype ==
Serotypes B15, B62, B63, B70, B71, B72, B75, B76, B77 recognition of the HLA B*15 gene products
| B*15 | B15 | B62 | B63 | B70 | B71 | B72 | B75 | B76 | B77 | Sample |
| allele | % | % | % | % | % | % | % | % | % | size (N) |
| *1501 | 2 | 96 | | | | | | | | 1906 |
| *1504 | 10 | 69 | | | | | | | | 29 |
| *1505 | 18 | 64 | | | | | | | | 22 |
| *1506 | | 40 | | 20 | | | 11 | | | 10 |
| *1507 | | 79 | | | | | | | | 101 |
| *1508 | | 20 | | | | | 18 | | | 45 |
| *1511 | 15 | 27 | | | | | 21 | | | 68 |
| *1512 | 17 | 18 | | | | | | 8 | | 12 |
| *1515 | 13 | 49 | | | | | 28 | | | 138 |
| *1520 | | 100 | | | | | | | | 5 |
| *1524 | | 44 | | | | | | | | 54 |
| *1525 | 7 | 74 | | | | | 8 | | | 116 |
| *1527 | 7 | 76 | | | | | | | | 76 |
| *1528 | 14 | 57 | | | | | 14 | | | 7 |
| *1530 | 17 | 64 | | | | | | | | 98 |
| *1531 | | 50 | | | | | | | | 12 |
| *1535 | | 79 | | | | | | | | 34 |
| Allele | B15 | B62 | B63 | B70 | B71 | B72 | B75 | B76 | B77 | N |
Alleles link-out to IMGT/HLA Databease at EBI

== Alleles ==
HLA B*1501 frequencies
| | | freq |
| ref. | Population | (%) |
| | Japan Ainu Hokkaido | 29.0 |
| | Chihuahuan Tarahumara | 14.8 |
| | Autonomous Tibetans | 12.3 |
| | South Korea ( 3) | 10.5 |
| | Japan Central | 8.7 |
| | Japan pop3 | 7.5 |
| | USA North American Natives | 7.2 |
| | South Dakota Lakota Sioux | 7.1 |
| | Shijiazhuang Tianjian Han | 7.0 |
| | China Qinghai Hui | 6.8 |
| | Croatia | 6.7 |
| | Japan pop5 | 6.5 |
| | Portugal Centre | 6.0 |
| | Taiwan Rukai | 6.0 |
| | USA Alaska Yupik Natives | 5.8 |
| | Australia New South Wales | 5.6 |
| | USA European Americans (2) | 5.6 |
| | France South East | 5.5 |
| | China Beijing | 5.3 |
| | Czech Republic | 4.7 |
| | Ireland South | 4.6 |
| | Mexico Sonora Seri | 4.5 |
| | China Inner Mongolia | 4.4 |
| | Russia Tuva (2) | 4.2 |
| | Singapore Chinese | 4.0 |
| | Taiwan Paiwan | 3.9 |
| | China North Han | 3.8 |
| | Georgia Svaneti Svans | 3.8 |
| | Ireland Northern | 3.8 |
| | Italy North Pavia | 3.7 |
| | Mexico Mestizos | 3.7 |
| | Azores Central Islands | 3.6 |
| | Madeira | 3.5 |
| | Taiwan Minnan pop 1 | 3.4 |
| | Azores Terceira Island | 3.1 |
| | Taiwan Siraya | 2.9 |
| | USA Hispanic | 2.8 |
| | Taiwan Hakka | 2.7 |
| | Taiwan Pazeh | 2.7 |
| | China Yunnan Nu | 2.6 |
| | Uganda Kampala | 2.5 |
| | Argentina Toba Rosario | 2.3 |
| | Romanian | 2.3 |
| | Hong Kong Chinese | 2.2 |
| | India North Hindus | 1.9 |
| | New Caledonia | 1.9 |
| | Italy South Campania | 1.8 |
| | Taiwan Thao | 1.7 |
| | India North Delhi | 1.6 |
| | China Guangzhou | 1.5 |
| | China Guangxi Maonan | 1.4 |
| | China Yunnan Lisu | 1.4 |
| | Thailand | 1.4 |
| | PNG New Britain Rabaul | 1.3 |
| | Brazil Belo Horizonte | 1.1 |
| | Cameroon Yaounde | 1.1 |
| | Portugal North | 1.1 |
| | United Arab Emerates | 1.1 |
| | Thailand pop3 | 1.0 |
| | USA African America | 1.0 |
| | USA African Americans | 1.0 |
| | Indig. Australian Yuendumu | 0.8 |
| | PNG Wanigela | 0.8 |
| | Mexico Zaptotec Oaxaca | 0.7 |
| | Spain Eastern Andalusia | 0.6 |
| | South African Natal Zulu | 0.5 |
| | Spain E. Andalusia Gipsy | 0.5 |
| | Sudanese | 0.5 |
| | Taiwan Bunun | 0.5 |

HLA B*1515 frequencies
| | | freq |
| ref. | Population | (%) |
| | Mexico Mestizos | 2.4 |
| | Mex. Guadalajara Mestizos (2) | 1.9 |
| | Argentina Toba Rosario | 1.2 |
| | China Guangdong Meizhou Han | 1.0 |
| | China North Han | 1.0 |
| | Cape Verde NW Islands | 0.8 |
| | USA South Texas Hispanics | 0.8 |
| | USA San Antonio Caucasians | 0.6 |
| | USA Hispanic | 0.4 |
| | USA Asian | 0.3 |
| | USA North American Natives | 0.3 |
| | USA African America | 0.2 |
| | Hong Kong Chinese | 0.1 |

HLA B*1525 frequencies
| | | freq |
| ref. | Population | (%) |
| | Taiwan Tao | 40.0 |
| | Taiwan Thao | 11.7 |
| | Taiwan Pazeh | 10.9 |
| | China Yunnan Lisu | 8.7 |
| | China Yunnan Nu | 8.3 |
| | PNG West Schrader Ranges | 8.2 |
| | Indig. Australian Groote Eylandt | 8.0 |
| | Taiwan Puyuma | 7.0 |
| | Taiwan Rukai | 7.0 |
| | Taiwan Bunun | 6.4 |
| | Indig. Australian Yuendumu | 5.7 |
| | Taiwan Siraya | 4.9 |
| | Taiwan Tsou | 4.9 |
| | Philippines Ivatan | 3.0 |
| | Taiwan Atayal | 2.8 |
| | Taiwan Ami | 2.6 |
| | Thailand | 2.5 |
| | China Guangzhou | 2.0 |
| | Thailand pop3 | 2.0 |
| | Hong Kong Chinese | 1.9 |
| | PNG Wanigela | 1.5 |
| | PNG Wosera | 1.5 |
| | Singapore Thai | 1.5 |
| | India Andhra Pradesh Golla | 1.4 |
| | PNG Eastern Highlands Goroka | 1.4 |
| | China South Han | 1.1 |
| | China Inner Mongolia | 1.0 |
| | India North Hindus | 1.0 |

HLA B*1507 frequencies
| | | freq |
| ref. | Population | (%) |
| | Argentina Toba Rosario | 8.1 |
| | New Mexico Canoncito Navajo | 3.7 |
| | Brazil Terena | 2.6 |
| | USA North American Natives | 0.8 |
| | Japan Central | 0.7 |
| | South Korea pop 3 | 0.6 |
| | Japan pop3 | 0.4 |
| | USA Asian | 0.4 |
| | Shijiazhuang Tianjian Han | 0.3 |
| | USA Caucasian pop2 | 0.2 |
| | Hong Kong Chinese | 0.1 |
| | Ireland Northern | 0.1 |
