= Carbamazepine =

Anticonvulsant medication

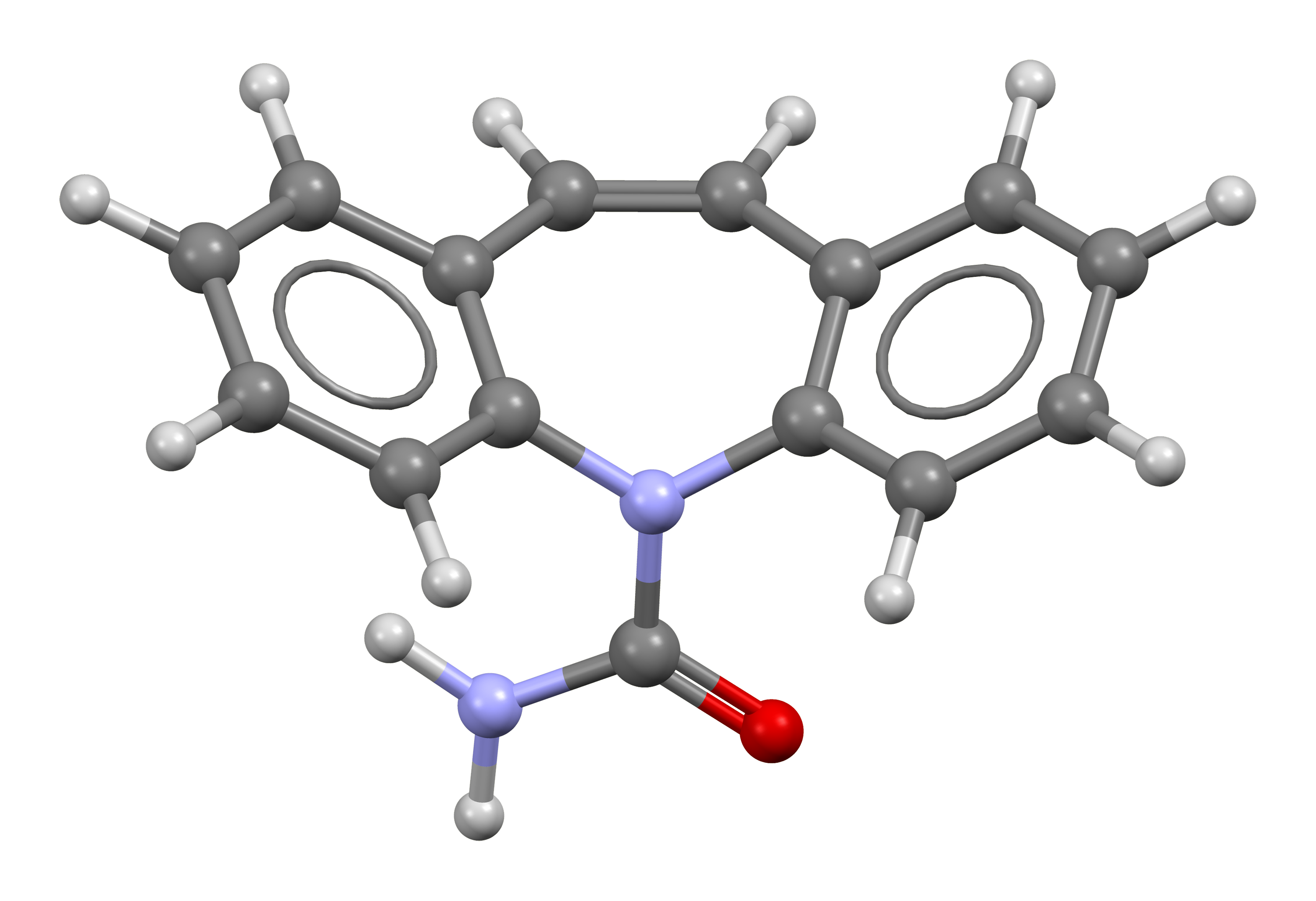

Clinical data
- Trade names: Tegretol, others
- Other names: CBZ
- AHFS/Drugs.com: Monograph
- MedlinePlus: a682237
- License data: US DailyMed: Carbamazepine
- Pregnancy category: AU: D
- Routes of administration: Oral, Intravenous
- Drug class: Anticonvulsant
- ATC code: N03AF01 (WHO)

Legal status
- Legal status: AU: S4 (Prescription only); BR: Class C1 (Other controlled substances); CA: ℞-only; UK: POM (Prescription only); US: ℞-only

Pharmacokinetic data
- Bioavailability: ~100%
- Protein binding: 70–80%
- Metabolism: Liver (CYP3A4)
- Metabolites: Active epoxide form (carbamazepine-10,11 epoxide)
- Elimination half-life: 36 hours (single dose), 16–24 hours (repeated dosing)
- Excretion: Urine (72%), feces (28%)

Identifiers
- IUPAC name: 5H-dibenzo[b,f]azepine-5-carboxamide
- CAS Number: 298-46-4 85756-57-6
- PubChem CID: 2554
- IUPHAR/BPS: 5339
- DrugBank: DB00564
- ChemSpider: 2457
- UNII: 33CM23913M
- KEGG: D00252
- ChEBI: CHEBI:3387
- ChEMBL: ChEMBL108
- CompTox Dashboard (EPA): DTXSID4022731
- ECHA InfoCard: 100.005.512

Chemical and physical data
- Formula: C_{15}H_{12}N_{2}O
- Molar mass: 236.274 g·mol^{−1}
- 3D model (JSmol): Interactive image
- SMILES: c1ccc2c(c1)C=Cc3ccccc3N2C(=O)N
- InChI: InChI=1S/C15H12N2O/c16-15(18)17-13-7-3-1-5-11(13)9-10-12-6-2-4-8-14(12)17/h1-10H,(H2,16,18); Key:FFGPTBGBLSHEPO-UHFFFAOYSA-N

Carbamazepine, sold under the brand name Tegretol among others, is an anticonvulsant medication used in the treatment of epilepsy and neuropathic pain. It is used as an adjunctive treatment in schizophrenia along with other medications and as a second-line agent in bipolar disorder. Carbamazepine appears to work as well as phenytoin and valproate for focal and generalized seizures. It is not effective for absence or myoclonic seizures.

Carbamazepine was discovered in 1953 by Swiss chemist Walter Schindler. It was first marketed in 1962. It is available as a generic medication. It is on the World Health Organization's List of Essential Medicines. In 2023, it was the 185th most commonly prescribed medication in the United States, with more than 2 million prescriptions.

Photoswitchable analogues of carbamazepine have been developed to control its pharmacological activity locally and on demand using light (photopharmacology), with the purpose of reducing the adverse systemic effects of the drug. One of these light-regulated compounds (carbadiazocine, based on a bridged azobenzene or diazocine) has been shown to produce analgesia with noninvasive illumination in vivo in a rat model of neuropathic pain.

== Medical uses ==
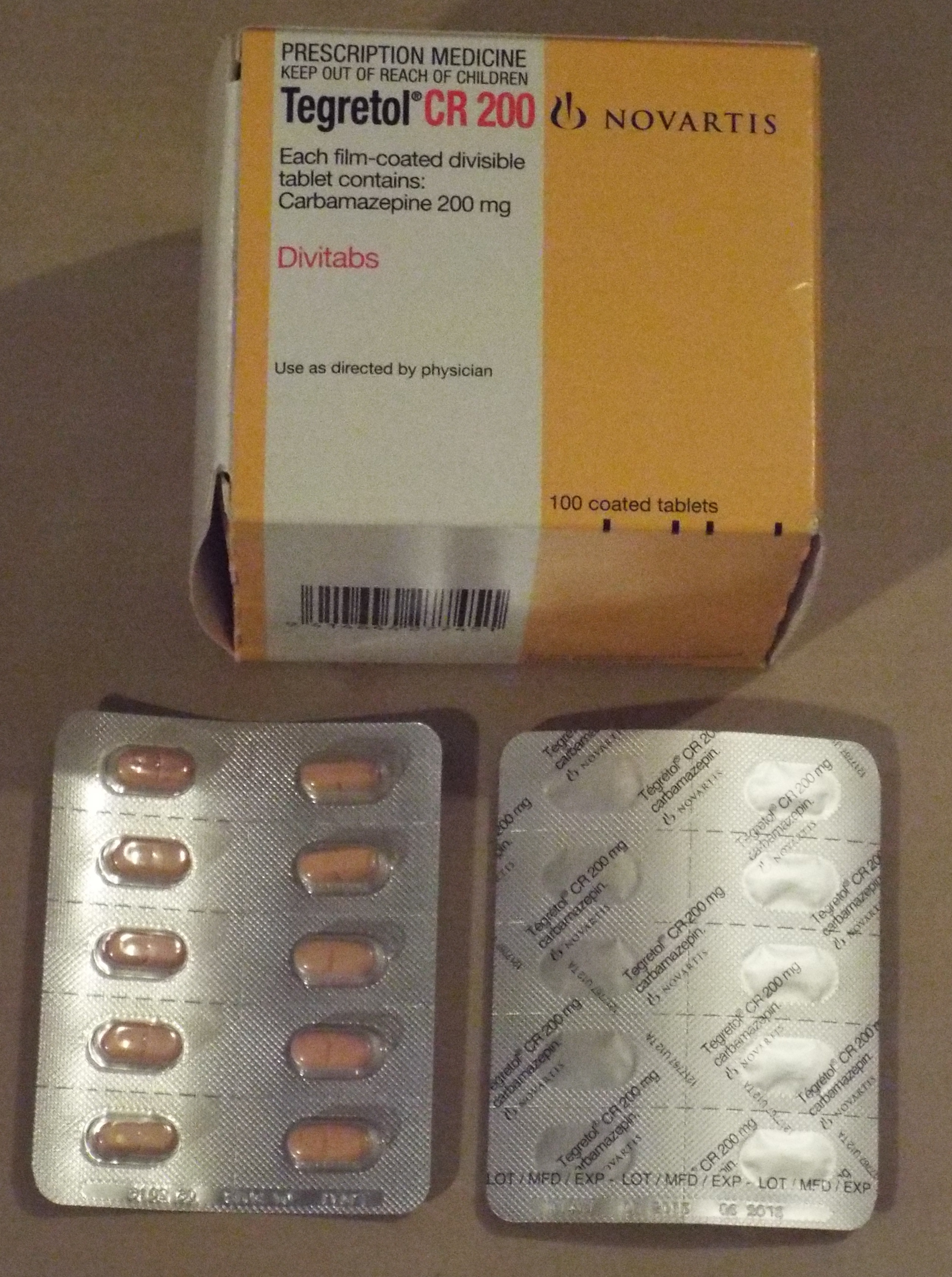
Tegretol 200-mg CR (made in NZ)

Carbamazepine is typically used for the treatment of seizure disorders and neuropathic pain. It is used off-label as a second-line treatment for bipolar disorder and in combination with an antipsychotic in some cases of schizophrenia when treatment with a conventional antipsychotic alone has failed. However, evidence does not support its usage for schizophrenia. It is not effective for absence seizures or myoclonic seizures. Although carbamazepine may have a similar effectiveness (as measured by people continuing to use a medication) and efficacy (as measured by the medicine reducing seizure recurrence and improving remission) when compared to phenytoin and valproate, it is not well-researched which medication is most helpful for people with newly-onset seizures.

In the United States, carbamazepine is indicated for the treatment of epilepsy (including partial seizures, generalized tonic-clonic seizures and mixed seizures), and trigeminal neuralgia. Carbamazepine is the only medication that is approved by the Food and Drug Administration for the treatment of trigeminal neuralgia.

As of 2014, a controlled release formulation was available for which there is tentative evidence showing fewer side effects and unclear evidence with regard to whether there is a difference in efficacy.

In 2016, the FDA approved an intravenous formulation of carbamazepine, also granting it orphan drug status under the trade name Carnexiv, as a short-term replacement therapy for oral carbamazepine in adults with specific types of seizure disorders, who are unable to tolerate the oral formulation. Carnexiv is indicated for short-term treatment of up to seven days for partial seizures with complex symptomatology, generalized tonic–clonic seizures and mixed seizure patterns, in patients who are temporarily unable to take or tolerate oral medications.

It has also been shown to improve symptoms of "typewriter tinnitus", a type of tinnitus caused by the neurovascular compression of the cochleovestibular nerve.

== Adverse effects ==
In the US, the label for carbamazepine contains warnings concerning:

- effects on the body's production of red blood cells, white blood cells, and platelets: rarely, there are major effects of aplastic anemia and agranulocytosis reported and more commonly, there are minor changes such as decreased white blood cell or platelet counts, but these do not progress to more serious problems.
- Bone marrow suppression
- increased risks of suicide
- increased risks of hyponatremia and SIADH
- risk of seizures, if the person stops taking the drug abruptly
- risks to the fetus in women who are pregnant, specifically congenital malformations like spina bifida, and developmental disorders.
- Pancreatitis
- Hepatitis
- Dizziness
- Stevens–Johnson syndrome
- SHBG elevation with effects on free testosterone
- dyslipidemia

Common adverse effects may include drowsiness, dizziness, headaches and migraines, ataxia, nausea, vomiting, and/or constipation. Alcohol use while taking carbamazepine may lead to enhanced depression of the central nervous system. Less common side effects may include increased risk of seizures in people with mixed seizure disorders, abnormal heart rhythms, blurry or double vision. Also, rare case reports of an auditory side effect have been made, whereby patients perceive sounds about a semitone lower than previously; this unusual side effect is usually not noticed by most people, and disappears after the person stops taking carbamazepine.

=== Pharmacogenetics ===
Serious skin reactions such as Stevens–Johnson syndrome (SJS) or toxic epidermal necrolysis (TEN) due to carbamazepine therapy are more common in people with a particular human leukocyte antigen gene-variant (allele), HLA-B*1502. Odds ratios for the development of SJS or TEN in people who carry the allele can be in the double, triple or even quadruple digits, depending on the population studied. HLA-B*1502 occurs almost exclusively in people with ancestry across broad areas of Asia, but has a very low or absent frequency in European, Japanese, Korean and African populations. However, the HLA-A*31:01 allele has been shown to be a strong predictor of both mild and severe adverse reactions, such as the DRESS form of severe cutaneous reactions, to carbamazepine among Japanese, Chinese, Korean, and Europeans. It is suggested that carbamazepine acts as a potent antigen that binds to the antigen-presenting area of HLA-B*1502 alike, triggering an everlasting activation signal on immature CD8-T cells, thus resulting in widespread cytotoxic reactions like SJS/TEN.

== Interactions ==
Carbamazepine has a potential for drug interactions. Drugs that decrease breaking down of carbamazepine or otherwise increase its levels include erythromycin, cimetidine, propoxyphene, and calcium channel blockers. Grapefruit juice raises the bioavailability of carbamazepine by inhibiting the enzyme CYP3A4 in the gut wall and in the liver. Lower levels of carbamazepine are seen when administered with phenobarbital, phenytoin, or primidone, which can result in breakthrough seizure activity.

Valproic acid and valnoctamide both inhibit microsomal epoxide hydrolase (mEH), the enzyme responsible for the breakdown of the active metabolite carbamazepine-10,11-epoxide into inactive metabolites. By inhibiting mEH, valproic acid and valnoctamide cause a build-up of the active metabolite, prolonging the effects of carbamazepine and delaying its excretion.

Carbamazepine, as an inducer of cytochrome P450 enzymes, may increase clearance of many drugs, decreasing their concentration in the blood to subtherapeutic levels and reducing their desired effects. Drugs that are more rapidly metabolized with carbamazepine include warfarin, lamotrigine, phenytoin, theophylline, valproic acid, many benzodiazepines, and methadone. Carbamazepine also increases the metabolism of the hormones in birth control pills and can reduce their effectiveness, potentially leading to unexpected pregnancies.

== Pharmacology ==
=== Mechanism of action ===
Carbamazepine is a sodium channel blocker. It binds preferentially to voltage-gated sodium channels in their inactive conformation, which prevents repetitive and sustained firing of an action potential. Carbamazepine has effects on serotonin systems but the relevance to its antiseizure effects is uncertain. There is evidence that it is a serotonin releasing agent and possibly even a serotonin reuptake inhibitor. It has been suggested that carbamazepine can also block voltage-gated calcium channels, which will reduce neurotransmitter release.

=== Pharmacokinetics ===
Metabolism. Top: carbamazepine • middle: carbamazepine-10,11-epoxide, the active metabolite • bottom: carbamazepine-10,11-diol, an inactive metabolite, which is then glucuronidized

Carbamazepine is relatively slowly but practically completely absorbed after administration by mouth. Highest concentrations in the blood plasma are reached after 4 to 24 hours depending on the dosage form. Slow release tablets result in about 15% lower absorption and 25% lower peak plasma concentrations than ordinary tablets, as well as in less fluctuation of the concentration, but not in significantly lower minimum concentrations.

In the circulation, carbamazepine itself comprises 20 to 30% of total residues. The remainder is in the form of metabolites; 70 to 80% of residues is bound to plasma proteins. Concentrations in breast milk are 25 to 60% of those in the blood plasma.

Carbamazepine is metabolized, mainly by CYP3A4, into carbamazepine-10,11-epoxide, which substantially contributes to the anticonvulsant effects of carbamazepine, which is also active itself. The epoxide is then inactivated by microsomal epoxide hydrolase (mEH) to carbamazepine-trans-10,11-diol and further to its glucuronides. Other metabolites include various hydroxyl derivatives and carbamazepine-N-glucuronide.

The plasma half-life is about 35 to 40 hours when carbamazepine is given as single dose, but it is a strong inducer of liver enzymes, and the plasma half-life shortens to about 12 to 17 hours when it is given repeatedly. The half-life can be further shortened to 9–10 hours by other enzyme inducers such as phenytoin or phenobarbital. About 70% are excreted via the urine, almost exclusively in form of its metabolites, and 30% via the faeces.. Valpromide, an valproate-related anticonvulsant and a mood stabilizer, is a strong epoxide hydrolase inhibitor, which prevents carbamazepine from being metabolized into carbamazepine-10,11-epoxide, which causes carbamazepine's pharmacological properties to rely only on carbamazepine as the parent-compound.

== History ==
Carbamazepine was discovered by chemist Walter Schindler at J.R. Geigy AG (now part of Novartis) in Basel, Switzerland, in 1953. It was first marketed as a drug to treat epilepsy in Switzerland in 1963 under the brand name Tegretol; its use for trigeminal neuralgia (formerly known as tic douloureux) was introduced at the same time. It has been used as an anticonvulsant and antiepileptic in the United Kingdom since 1965, and has been approved in the United States since 1968.

Carbamazepine was studied for bipolar disorder throughout the 1970s.

== Society and culture ==
=== Environmental impact ===
Carbamazepine and its bio-transformation products have been detected in wastewater treatment plant effluent and in streams receiving treated wastewater. Field and laboratory studies have been conducted to understand the accumulation of carbamazepine in food plants grown in soil treated with sludge, which vary with respect to the concentrations of carbamazepine present in sludge and in the concentrations of sludge in the soil. Taking into account only studies that used concentrations commonly found in the environment, a 2014 review concluded that "the accumulation of carbamazepine into plants grown in soil amended with biosolids poses a de minimis risk to human health according to the approach."

=== Brand names ===
Carbamazepine is available worldwide under many brand names including Tegretol.
