= HLA-DR1 =

Serotype of cell surface receptors

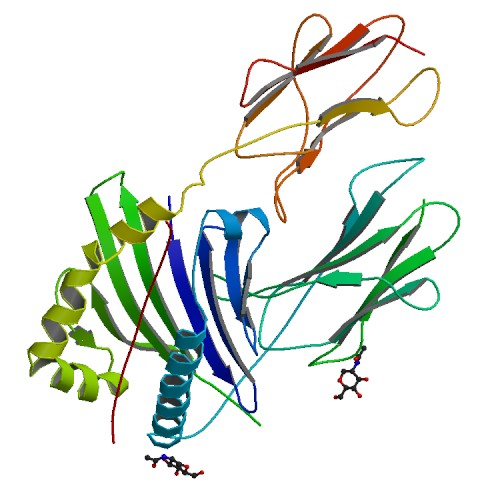
DR1 binding pocket with ligand PDB: 2G9H
major histocompatibility complex, class II, DR1
Haplotypes groups	DRA*01:DRB1*01:01 DRA*01:DRB1*01:02 DRA*01:DRB1*01:03
Structure (See HLA-DR)
Identifiers	alpha *01:01
Symbol(s)	HLA-DRA
EBI-HLA	DRA *01:01
Identifiers	beta 1 *01:01, *01:02, *01:03 . . .
Symbol(s)	HLA-DRB1
Shared data
Locus	chr.6 6p21.31

HLA-DR1 (DR1) is a HLA-DR serotype that recognizes the DRB1*01 gene products. It has been observed to be common among centenarians.

== Serology ==
DR1 serotype recognition of Some DRB1*01 allele-group gene products
DRB1*	DR1	DR103		Sample
allele	%	%	%	size (N)
*01:01	97%			6317
*01:02	95%			2035
*01:03	56%	12%		1186
*01:05	>50%			2

The serology for the most common DR1 alleles is excellent. The serology for alleles *01:04, *01:06, *01:09, *01:10, *0112, *0115, and *0116 is unknown.

== Disease associations ==
=== By serotype ===
DR1 is associated with seronegative-rheumatoid arthritis, penicillamine-induced myasthenia, and schizophrenia. DR1 is increased in patients with systemic sclerosis and arthritis and in ulcerative colitis with patients that have articular manifestations.

=== By allele ===
DRB1*01:01 is associated with rheumatoid arthritis, in anti-Jk(a) mediated hemolytic transfusion reactions, foliaceous pemphigus, HTLV-1-associated myelopathy/tropical spastic paraparesis, and lichen planus. In lyme disease arthritis, *01:01 appears to play a role in presentation of triggering microbial antigens.

DRB1*01:02 is associated with rheumatoid arthritis, in anti-Jk(a) mediated hemolytic transfusion reactions, psoriasis vulgaris, and recurrent respiratory papillomatosis

DRB1*01:03 is associated with colonic Crohn's disease and ulcerative colitis.

=== By genotype ===
DRB1*01:01/*0404 and *01:01/*0401 increases risk of mortality in rheumatoid arthritis, with ischemic heart disease and smoking. these same genotypes are associated with rheumatoid vasculitis.

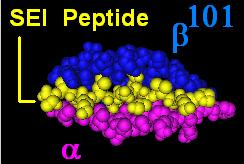
ligand (Staphylococcal enterotoxin 1-C peptide:pkyvkqntlklat) within the binding pocket of DR αβ^{101}

=== By haplotype ===
DRB1*01:02:DQB1*05:01 is associated with psoriasis vulgaris and tubulointerstitial nephritis & uveitis syndrome, but is relatively protective against juvenile diabetes.

DR1-DQ5 is associated with tubulointerstitial nephritis & uveitis syndrome.

Diseases associated with HLA-DR and links to DR subpages(V - T)
Class	Disease	Associated DR	2	3	4
	alopecia areata	DR5			
anemia	pernicious	DR15			
	antiphospholipid syndrome, primary	DR5	DR12		
aneurysm	coronary artery	DR16			
arteritis	Takayasu's	DR16			
arthritis, rheumatoid	juvenile	DR4	DR5	DR14	DR15
arthritis, rheumatoid	pauciarticular, juv.	DR8			
arthritis, rheumatoid	Still's disease	DR12			
arthritis, rheumatoid	iritis w/juv. arthritis	DR12			
arthritis, rheumatoid	seropositive	DR1	DR4	DR10	
arthritis, rheumatoid	w/systemic sclerosis	DR1			
arthritis, rheumatoid	lyme disease induced	DR4			
arthritis, rheumatoid	tiopronin intolerance	DR5	DR11	DR12	
cardiomyopathy	hypertrophic	DR4	DR17		
cardiomyopathy	T. cruzi induced	DR4	DR7	DR15	
colitis	Crohn's	DR1			
colitis	ulcerative	DR1			
diabetes	juvenile (type 1)	DR3	DR4	DR17	DR18
diabetes	fatty liver (type 2)	DR8			
encephalomyelitis	rabies vaccine-induced	DR17			
encephalopathy	acute necrotizing	DR52			
epilepsy	childhood	DR5			
epilepsy	infantile/spasm	DR17			
heart disease	rheumatic	DR16			
hepatitis	autoimmune	DR2	DR4	DR17	
hepatitis	primary biliary cirrhosis	DR2	DR8		
hepatitis	chronic type C	DR11			
	lichen planus	DR1	DR10		
lupus,	systemic	DR3	DR4	DR52	
lupus,	hydralazine-induced	DR4			
lupus,	with Sjögren syndrome	DR15			
lymphadenopathy	generalized	DR5			
lymphoma,	mycosis fungoides	DR5			
	melioidosis	DR16			
myasthenia	gravis	DR3	DR6	DR13	DR14
myasthenia	penicillamine-induced	DR1			
myositis	inflammatory inclusion body	DR17	DR18	DR52	
	narcolepsy	DR2	DR12		
nephritis,	tubulointerstitial	DR1			
nephropathy	IgA-mediated	DR4			
	polyglandular deficiency syndrome	DR5			
pemphigus	foliaceous	DR1			
pemphigus	vulgaris	DR4			
psoriasis	vulgaris	DR1	DR7		
papillomatosis,	respiratory	DR1			
sarcoidosis	non-chronic	DR17	DR52		
sclerosis,	multiple	DR2	DR15	DR53	
sclerosis,	"bout onset" multiple	DR3			
sclerosis,	systemic	DR4	DR11	DR16	DR52
sclerosis,	vulval lichen	DR12			
schizophrenia		DR1			
susceptibility	leprosy	DR2			
susceptibility	tuberculosis	DR2			
susceptibility	ragweed Ra6 allergy	DR5			
susceptibility	asthma, mite sensitive	DR11			
susceptibility	2ndary infection, AIDS	DR3			
susceptibility	aspergillosis	DR15			
susceptibility	Kaposi's sarcoma	DR5			
susceptibility	thyroid carcinomas	DR8	DR11		
susceptibility	ovarian/cervical cancer	DR10	DR11	DR15	
susceptibility	grape induced anaphylaxis	DR11			
susceptibility	Chlamydia pneumoniae	DR52			
thyroiditis	Hashimoto's	DR3	DR5		
thyroiditis	Graves'	DR3	DR17	DR52	
uveitis	tubulointerstitial	DR1			
^{*}references are provided on linked subpages

== Rheumatoid arthritis ==
DR1 are associated with rheumatoid arthritis, and while not the strongest association with the highest risk for early onset arthritis is within the DR4-bearing Native American population. There frequency of DR4-DQ8 haplotypes reach extreme nodal levels. Arthritis has been identified in a pre-Columbian remains from Italy, the affected individual bearing the DRB1*01:01 allele. DRB1*01:01 and most DR4 have in common a 'shared epitope'. In this hypothesis a common region of the beta chain, positions 67 to 74, are common and may be integral to presenting auto-immunological peptides.

== Genetic linkage ==
DR1 Haplotypes
Serotypes	DRA	DRB1
DR1	*01:01	*01:01
DR1	*01:01	*01:02
DR1	*01:01	*01:03
Serotypes	DQA1	DQB1	DRB1
DR1-DQ5 (5.1, 1)	*01:01	*05:01	*01:01
DR1-DQ5 (5.1, 1)	*01:01	*05:01	*01:02
DR1-DQ5 (5.1, 1)	*01:01	*05:01	*01:03
Serotypes	HLA-A	HLA C	HLA B	DRB1
A3-Cw4-B35-DR1	*03:01	*04:01	*35:01	*01:01
A11-Cw4-B35-DR1	*11:01	*04:01	*35:01	*01:03
A33-Cw8-B14-DR1	*33:01	*08:02	*14:02	*01:02

HLA-DR1 is not genetically linked to DR51, DR52 or DR53, but is linked to HLA-DQ1 and DQ5 serotypes.
