= HLA DR3-DQ2 =

- HLA region on chromosome 6

Nicknames
- HLA DRB1*0301:DQA1*0501:DQB1*0201

Loci
Loci	Gene	Allele	Serotype
HLA-DR	HLA-DRA	*0101
HLA-DR	HLA-DRB1	*0301	DR3
HLA-DR	HLA-DRB3	*0101	DR52
HLA-DQ	HLA-DQA1	*0501
HLA-DQB1	*0201	DQ2

Nodes
- Population_{Maxima}: Sardinia
- Freq._{Max}: 22%

Size and location
- Genes: 5
- Chromosome: 6
- Location: 6p21.3
- Size (kbps): 300

Associated diseases
Haplotype (gene)	Disease(s)
DQ2.5	Coeliac disease
DR3-DQ2	Juvenile diabetes
DR3-DQ2	Sarcoidosis

HLA DR3-DQ2 is a double serotype that specifically recognizes cells from individuals who carry a multigene HLA DR, DQ haplotype. Certain HLA DR and DQ genes have known involvement in autoimmune diseases. DR3-DQ2, a multigene haplotype, stands out in prominence because it is a factor in several prominent diseases, namely coeliac disease and juvenile diabetes. In coeliac disease, the DR3-DQ2 haplotype is associated with highest risk for disease in first degree relatives, highest risk is conferred by DQA1*0501:DQB1*0201 homozygotes and semihomozygotes of DQ2, and represents the overwhelming majority of risk. HLA DR3-DQ2 encodes DQ2.5cis isoform of HLA-DQ, this isoform is described frequently as 'the DQ2 isoform', but in actuality there are two major DQ2 isoform. The DQ2.5 isoform, however, is many times more frequently associated with autoimmune disease, and as a result to contribution of DQ2.2 is often ignored.

The frequency of both diseases changes concerning both the environment (diet) and the frequency of the DR3-DQ2. With coeliac disease risk is increased with the consumption of Triticeae glutens, and this also increases risk in juvenile diabetes whereas other cereals also appear to play a role. More importantly the risk of disease is greatest in homozygotes and linear increases in haplotype result in several fold increases in disease risk. This increased risk is most prominent in a rare cancer, enteropathy associated T-cell lymphoma. HLA-DR3-DQ2 is found in HLA A1-B8-DR3-DQ2 haplotype in Northern Europeans (including the British Ilse, Ireland, Iceland).

== Genetic Linkage ==
HLA DR3-DQ2 is the serotypic representation of a HLA-DRB1:DQA1:DQB1 cis-chromosomal haplotype on human 6p21.3 in a region known as the HLA complex. The DR3-DQ2 haplotype is notable because of the very strong linkage between genes that extends into the HLA-A, -B and -C regions of the HLA gene complex in northern and northwestern Europe. The linked haplotype is HLA A1-B8-DR3-DQ2 (AH8.1 in the most recent literature)

Because of its strong linkage disequilibrium, each of the genes in the haplotype are markers for probable presence of adjacent genes. However serotyping does not recognize genes, but clusters of gene products. For example, DQ2 recognizes both DQB1*0201, DQB1*0202, DQB1*0203. DQB1*0202 is not genetically linked to DQA1*0501 and its cis-haplotype isoform infrequently mediates coeliac disease or type 1 diabetes. For serotypic identification of the DQ2.5cis isoform requires the DR3 (or HLA-DR17 or HLA-DR18) and DQ2 serotypes.

An example of phenotypes that can mediate CD and T1D, the DR3-DQ2/X serotypes and the DR5-DQ7/DR7-DQ2 serotypes can mediate celiac disease with equal efficiency but the DR5-DQ7/DR7-DQ2 cannot mediate T1D as successfully as DR4-DQ8 or DR3-DQ2 (X is not DR3-DQ2 or DR7-DQ2).

== Distribution ==
HLA DR3-DQ2 is not spread evenly among humans. It has a substantially higher frequency in the western world, except indigenous Native American (see tables). It is virtually absent in some Asian populations. It current world distribution suggest that it spread from Africa with a wave that spread late in human evolution which reached central Asia more recently, a possibility is that it spread with agrarian cultures that migrated from Africa. [Note some population test DR3 or DQA1:DQB1, the DR3-DQ2 serotype is generally synonymous in frequency with DQ2.5]

=== Frequencies in Africa ===
Table 2.1.1 DR3 and DQ2.5 levels in Africans (given as frequency in %)
h	Reference	DRB1	DQA1	DQB1	Haplo.	Estimated
h	Population	0301	0501	0201	DR3-DQ2	DQ2.5
	Suoss (Morocco)	17.3	28.6*	37.8*	17.3	17.3
	Berbers	14.8	27.3*	29.7*	14.3	14.3
	Tunis (Tunisia)	15.1		15.9		14.1
	Bubi (Gabon)				12.5	12.5
	Aka pygmy (Congo)				11.2	11.2
	Algeria	11.8		35.3*	11.3	11.3
	Senegal				9.6	9.6
	Amhara (Ethiopia)	6.5	20.9*	30.1*	7.7	7.7
	Bantu (Congo)	6.5	17.1	35.3*	6.5	6.5
	!Kung (Namibia)	1.9		11.9*		1.9
h	* = Allele stated contains 2 or more alleles.

DR3-DQ2 probably originated from Central or West Africa. DQ2.5cis haplotype is the second highest frequency haplotype in the Aka (N. Congo) and several other surrounding groups it is virtually absent in the !Kung. DQ2.5 primarily spread to the northwest and appears to have spread late in global spread of anatomically modern humans. The !Kung and Austronesians are reasonable marker populations earliest (eatward) spread out of Africa and those that spread rapidly, since the ancestors of the !Kung appear to have come from East Africa and share many Cw_B types in common with Austronesians and Northern Eurasians. DQ2.5 is at low frequencies in both of these populations, and it did not spread to Japan or the New World in pre-Columbian times. There is the possibility it spread to Arabia, but through stepwise expansion of small groups was lost from the DQ genetic repertoire.

DQ2.5 appears to be derived from DQ2.2 by gene recombination. One haplotype DQA1*0501:DQB1*0202 can be found in Africa suggesting DQB1*0201 evolved from DQB1*0202. The regions of Africa where DQ2.5 is at its highest frequencies indicate potential sources for western European haplotypes (e.g. bedoin) but also indicate recent dispersion making precise evolution difficult to interpret. Other evidence for a west African origin/expansion is seen with the probable origin of DQA1*0501 from DQA1*0505, which is at relatively high frequencies in west-central Africa.

=== Frequencies in Europe ===
B8, DR3 and DQ2.5 levels in Europeans (given as frequency in %)
Reference	B8	DR17	DRB1	Haplo.	Estimated
Population	(&A30B18)	(DR3)	0301	DR3DQ2	DQ2.5
Sardinian	(20.0)	25.7		21.9	22.0
Basque (Spain)	(15)		19.2	21.9	22.0
Western Irish				20.8	21.5
Irish	17.7	(17.4)			17.0
Swedish	16.0			15.9	15.9
Arratia (Spain)	(15.3)		17.3	12.0	12.0
Wales	16.5		16.6	14.7	14.7
Dutch	12.1	(13.2)		14.4	13.2
Belgium	5.5	(15.7)		14.2	14.2
England	13.7	(12.4)			12.4
Yugoslavia	10.7	(11.5)		12.0	12.0
Cornish	11.4	(11.4)		11.4	11.4
Danish	8.9	(11.3)		11.3	11.3
Swiss	10.3	(11.6)			10.3
Poland	10.3	(10.7)		10.7	10.7
Paris	(7.7)	(10.1)		9.7	9.7
Arab Israeli				9.6	9.6
Turk			9.6	9.2	9.2
Finn	8.9	6.0		9.2	9.0
Russian			9.5	9.0	9.0
Svanetian	6.8		8.7		8.7
Croatian	6.4		8.3		8.3
Bulgarian	18.2		8.2		8.0
Greek	3.6		6.5	6.3	6.3
NE. Turk	3.4	5.6			5.4
Macedonian	6.8		6.8	5.0	5.0
non-Ashk Jew.			7.8	4.4	4.4

In identifying DR3-DQ2 studies of DR3 and DQ8 frequencies, when DQ2.5 frequencies are not clear, are helpful. DQ8 is helpful because of the strong linkage disequilibrium (LD) of the "super B8" haplotype. Unclear genetic information has come about because of false genotyping assumptions in older studies. DQB1*0201 may be available, but most often it is given incorrectly (DQB1*0201 = DQB1*0201 + DQB1*0202 + DQB1*0203). DQA1*0501 is often given incorrectly (DQB1*0501 = DQB1*0501 + DQB1*0505). These typing errors were not fully recognized until 2000. B8 frequencies are less useful in Southern and Eastern Europe, and there is no B allele that is in strong LD with DR3-DQ2. Therefore, as one moves east and southward B8 less predictive and DRB1*03 and DQB1*0201 (if DQB1*0202 is also given) must be relied upon.

European DR3-DQ2 is ancestrally derived from Africa, probably from Southwestern Europe or the Levant (in which DQ2.5 may have undergone negative, coeliac disease, selection during the holocene). Since the last glacial maximum there appears to be two sources of DR3-DQ2. The first, propagating "super b8" is from Iberia into much of western and central Europe. The second, propagating A30-B18-DR3-DQ2, is from Africa into Sardinia, Iberia, France and Italy.

Anti-node in Western Europe. DR3-DQ2 was probably the predominant HLA haplotype in the early holocene Western and Central Europe, archaeological studies of France, particularly of the Paris Basin region indicate a cultural shift that occurs as a result of the Neolithic revolution. In this region of France DR3-DQ2 specifically associated with super-B8 forms an anti-node of frequencies, whereas HLA types more common in Italy, Greece and the middle east are more common within this region of France. Other haplotypes indicate this introgression was significant over and the primary wheat farming regions of Europe.

Multiple Nodes. Because of the central location of the anti-node, the center of expansion of DR3-DQ2 with the recolonization of western Europe after the last glacial maximum has been obscured. However, the frequency is still high within the Basque of NE Spain, including some Super-B8 haplotype. The highest frequency of this node is in Western Ireland. Despite its high frequency Ireland is not likely the source of the haplotype in European, but a region that has been least disturbed by the negative selection of wheat culture and migrations. Much of Ireland was covered in glacial ice in the late Paleolithic and few exploitable resources. Colonization started about 10500 years ago, whereas neolithization started about 6500 years ago and was dominated by cattle culture with some wheat and minor barley cultivation. The paleontology of Europe during the last glacial maximum suggests that the most likely places of origin are NE Iberia, Southern France and new ice-core evidence suggests that final spread northward probably occurred after Younger Dryas.

=== Frequencies in Asia ===
DR3 and DQ2.5 levels in Asians (given as frequency in %)
Reference	DR17	DRB1	Haplo.	Estimated
Population	(DR3)	0301	DR3DQ2	DQ2.5
Kazakh	13.1			13.1
Uygar (China)	14.0		12.6	12.6
Tsaatan (Mongolia)	12.5			12.5
Khalka (Mongolia)	9.0		11.5	11.5
Australia (New South Wales)			11.4	11.4
Iranian	10.0		10.0	10.0
Muong (Viet Nam)	12.7		9.8	9.8
Oold (Mongolia)			8.7	8.7
Jing (China)			8.1	8.1
N.W. Han (China)	7.6		7.6	7.6
Mansi (Russia)		7.4	7.4	7.4
N.India	7.4		7.4	7.4
Iran (Yadz)	5.4		5.4	5.4
Hanoi (Viet Nam)	4.4		4.0	4.0
Buryat (Siberia)		4.0	4.0	4.0
Shandong (China)			3.6	3.6
Korean		2.9	2.9	2.9
Nusa Ten. (Indonesia)		2.4	2.4	2.4
Ulchi		1.4	1.4	1.4
Ryūkyū (Japan)	0.0		0.0	0.0
Japanese		0.7	0.3	0.3
Ainu(Japan)		0.0	0.0	0.0
ket(Russia)	0.0		0.0	0.0
Ngasan(Siberia)	0.0		0.0	0.0
Negidal(Siberia)		0.0	0.0	0.0
Molacca(Indonesia)		0.0	0.0	0.0

Based on frequencies in Central and East Asia, DR3_DQ2 appears to have spread eastward recently. Of particular interest to the West African/Central Asian comparison, not only is DQ3-DQ2.5 elevated in both places, but a linked HLA A-B haplotype, A33-B58, is found in West Africans and both the A33 and B58 alleles show more allelic and haplotype diversity in West Africa. This similarity would be remarkable if this haplotype came with migrations 50,000 to 130,000 years ago, since considerable equilibration and long range migrations are expected over this time frame. Ironically, there is no convincing route of travel between West Africa and Central Asia suggested by gene frequencies in the peoples between the two. This recent migration hypothesis is supported by HLA-A36 which shows a similar African/Central Asian bimodal distribution. One population that might have been related to this migration are non-caucasians of northern Africa.

DR3-DQ2 is notably higher in W. Mongolia, Kazakhstan and W. China. One eastern haplotype is "A33-B58" and has some punctuated distribution in Western Europe at relatively low levels, and is also in extreme disequilibrium where it is found, elsewhere. In Thailand it is elevated, particularly in the Thai Chinese, but in the south and most parts of Indonesia its frequency is zero. Elevated DR3-DQ2 levels in the Muong suggest a similar North to South spread.

DR3-DQ2 presence in the Koreans and lack thereof in the Japanese suggest a recent spread into Western Pacific Rim of Asia. By HLA, Y chromosome, or mitochondrial DNA the Japanese are about 60-85% of post-Jōmon period Korean origin, and the level of DR3-DQ2 in Japanese is about 1/10 that of Koreans suggesting that DR3-DQ2 did not spread in the Yayoi and that it spread recently with Mongol spread in Eastern Asia, it is rare both east and south of China (except in regions with strong historic migrations of Chinese), rare in Indigenous Austronesians, and isolated Indigeonous American groups.

=== The importance of the estimates ===
Currently, in assessing diseases like Coeliac disease a definite diagnosis is often not possible and statistical considerations are relied upon. The knowledge of frequencies in populations, particularly among ancestors of immigrants can aid patient and physician as to the potential risks. An example, one publication states that the western regions of Ireland have the highest coeliac disease rate in the world. Plotting the frequency of DQ2.5 from any part of Western Europe to the Irish one sees the frequency gradient progressing toward the north and west of Ireland; therefore, a high rate of coeliac disease is not unexpected in Western Ireland. People with many common ancestors from Ireland share similar risks of disease.

In the case of juvenile diabetes a clear distinction of DR3-DQ2 from DR7-DQ2 is necessary because both DR3 and DQ2 confer risk of disease. And DR3-DQ2/DR4-DQ8 individuals who have type 1 diabetes (late onset) are often mistaken for type-2 diabetes.

== Associated Diseases ==
DR3-DQ2 is associated with probably the greatest frequency of autoimmune occurrence relative to any other haplotype. The DQA1*0501:DQB1*0201 (DQ2.5) locus confers susceptibility to Gluten Sensitive Enteropathy (GSE)and (Type 1 Diabetes) but has also been linked to other rarer autoimmune diseases like myasthenia gravis.

=== Type 1 diabetes ===
In type 1 diabetes both DR3 and DQ2 appear to play a role.

- DR3-DQ2.5 can be established to other genes like TNF-305A (TNF2) which may also increase the risk of autoimmune disease in both Coeliac Disease and Type 1 diabetes. In systemic lupus erythematosus (SLE) patients HLA DR3-DQ2.5-C4AQ0, which was strongly associated with SLE (odds ratio [OR] 2.8, 95% CI 1.7-4.5).
- A more recent paper shows that Inositol triphosphate receptor 3 gene which is ~ 1 million base pairs from DQ2.5 is also associated with Type 1 diabetes.

=== Sarcoidosis ===
A relationship between HLA and sarcoidosis has been known for 30+ years. However, the association is weak and has not been reproducible in all studies. A common serologically defined haplotype in Europeans is HLA A1-B8-DR3-DQ2.5 (see above). In non-persistent sarcoidosis this haplotype was found to be increased in sarcoidosis, and further study eliminated risk contributed by A1-Cw7-B8 indicating DR3-DQ2 haplotype contains risk of disease (OR = 11.8)

=== Extended linkage ===
- DQ2.5 is also linked to the IgA-less phenotype which may or may not increase susceptibility to diseases. This imposes a problem for understanding autoimmunity in DQ2.5, since many genes linked to disease with partial contributions are some degree of disequilibration with DQ2.5 loci and thus DQ2.5 masks genetic association via it positive association with some many diseases.
