= HLA-DR52 =

major histocompatibility complex, class II, DR53
Haplotypes groups	DRA*01:DRB3*01 DRA*01:DRB3*02 DRA*01:DRB3*03
Structure (See HLA-DR)
Identifiers	alpha *01:01
Symbol(s)	HLA-DRA
EBI-HLA	DRA*01:01
Identifiers	beta 3 *01 *02 *03
Symbol(s)	HLA-DRB3
EBI-HLA	DRB3*01
EBI-HLA	DRB3*02
EBI-HLA	DRB3*03
Shared data
Locus	chr.6 6p21.31

HLA-DR52 is an HLA-DR serotype that recognizes gene products of HLA-DRB3 locus. Three allele groups can produce 35 isoforms.

DRB3, DRB4, and DRB5 are minor DR beta-encoding loci, and they have been recognized as having distinct evolution, having diverged from DRB1 around 4 million years ago.

The DRB3 locus is only apparent in a small subset of DR haplotypes, and most individuals lack DRB3.

== Alleles ==
DR52 recognition of some DRB3* alleles
DRB3*	DR52	?	Sample
allele	%	%	size (N)
01:01	95		62
01:02	99		1
02:01	99		2
02:02	95		100
02:03	95		1
03:01	95		36

== Associated diseases ==
DR52 serotype is positively associated with systemic sclerosis, inflammatory myopathies, inclusion body myositis,

DRB3*01 is positively associated with sarcoidosis, Grave's Disease, pulmonary sarcoidosis,

DRB3*01:01:DRB1*03:01 is linked to Lofgren's syndrome

DRB3*02:02 is also linked to Grave's disease, serum IgG antibodies to Chlamydia pneumoniae with essential hypertension, acute necrotizing encephalopathy

DRB3*03:01 is weakly associated with anticardiolipin antibodies in SLE

DRB3*03:01:DRB1*13:02 may be associated with Crohn's disease

=== DRB1 linkage ===
HLA-DRB3 is linked to these HLA-DR serotypes and DRB1 allele groups:

HLA-DR3 - DRB1*03

HLA-DR5 -

- HLA-DR11 - DRB1*11
- HLA-DR12 - DRB1*12

HLA-DR6 -

- HLA-DR13 - DRB1*13
- HLA-DR14 - DRB1*14

Rarely HLA-DR8 - DRB1*08

HLA-DR52 - Sjögren syndrome
