= HLA-DR9 =

human major histocompatibility complex, class II, DR9
Haplotypes groups	DQA*01:DRB1*0901 to DQA*01:DRB1*0906
Structure (See HLA-DR)
Identifiers	alpha *0101
Symbol(s)	HLA-DRA
EBI-HLA	DRA*0101
Identifiers	beta 1 *0901
Symbol(s)	HLA-DRB1
EBI-HLA	DRB1*0901
Shared data
Locus	chr.6 6p21.31

HLA-DR09 (DR9) is a HLA-DR serotype that recognizes the DRB1*0901 gene product.

== Serology ==
DR9 recognition of some DRB1*0901 alleles
DRB1*	DR9			Sample
allele	%	%	%	size (N)
0901	95			1058

The serological reaction of DR9 is relatively good. The serology of DRB1*0902 to *0906 serotypes is unknown.

== Disease associations ==
DRB1*0901: Early childhood myasthenia gravis

=== Extended linkage ===
DRB1*0901:DQA1*0301:DQB1*0303 haplotype: Early childhood myastenia gravis

== Genetic linkage ==
DR09 Haplotypes
	DRA	DRB1
Haplotypes	*0101	*0901	*0101
	DQA1	DQB1	DRB1
Haplotypes	*0301	*0303	*0901
	HLA-A	HLA-B	DRB1
Haplotypes	*0000	*0000	*0901

HLA-DR9 is genetically linked to HLA-DR53, and HLA-DQ3 and DQ9 serotypes.
