= HLA-DR3 =

major histocompatibility complex, class II, DR3
Haplotypes groups	DRA*01:DRB1*03:01 DRA*01:DRB1*03:02 DRA*01:DRB1*03:03 DRA*01:DRB1*03:04
Structure (See HLA-DR)
Identifiers	alpha *01:01
Symbol(s)	HLA-DRA
EBI-HLA	DRA*01:01
Identifiers	beta 1 *03:01 *03:01 *03:02 *03:03 *03:04
Symbol(s)	HLA-DRB1
EBI-HLA	DRB1*03:01
EBI-HLA	DRB1*03:02
EBI-HLA	DRB1*03:03
EBI-HLA	DRB1*03:04
EBI-HLA	DRB1*03:05
Shared data
Locus	chr.6 6p21.31

HLA-DR3 is composed of the HLA-DR17 and HLA-DR18 split 'antigens' serotypes. DR3 is a component gene-allele of the AH8.1 haplotype in Northern and Western Europeans. Genes between B8 and DR3 on this haplotype are frequently associated with autoimmune disease. Type 1 diabetes mellitus is associated with HLA-DR3 or HLA-DR4. Nearly half the US population has either DR3 or DR4 (only 1–3% have both), yet only a small percentage (about 0.5%) of these individuals will develop type 1 diabetes.

== Serology ==
DR17 and DR3 recognition of some DRB1*03 alleles
DRB1*	DR3	DR17	DR18	Sample
allele	%	%	%	size (N)
03:01	33	64	0	9698
03:02	24	3	66	317
03:03	40		60	5
03:04	60	20		5
03:07	>50			1

Some DR3 also react with HLA-DR17 and/or HLA-DR18. The DRB1*03:04 primarily reacts with DR3. The serotypes of *03:05, *03:06, *03:08 to *03:31 are unknown.

== Disease associations ==
=== By serotype ===
HLA-DR3 is associated with early-age onset myasthenia gravis, Hashimoto's thyroiditis (along with DR5), primary sclerosing cholangitis, and opportunistic infections in AIDS, but lowered risk for cancers. It is also associated with membranous glomerulonephritis

=== By allele ===
DRB1*03:01 (see HLA-DR17)

DRB1*03:02 (See HLA-DR18)

DRB1*03:04 is associated with Graves disease

=== By haplotypes ===
DR3 and/or DQ2 is associated with Moreen's ulceration, "bout onset" multiple sclerosis, Graves' disease and systemic lupus erythematosus

DR3-DQ2 linkage is associated with coeliac disease, dermatitis herpetiformis, Diabetes mellitus type 1. DR3-DQ2 is the serological marker for HLA-DQ2.5cis isoform. Although it cannot identify the alpha ".5" chain of HLA DQ, DQA1*05:01 gene is almost always found within the DR3-DQ2 haplotype Eurasia (however in older studies DQA1*05:05 is commonly confused with DQA1*05:01)

== Genetic linkage ==
DR3 is genetically linked to HLA-DR52, DRB3*02:02 allele, and HLA-DQ2 (DQ2.5).
