= HLA-DR7 =

human major histocompatibility complex, class II, DR7
Haplotypes groups	DQA*01:DRB1*0701
Structure (See HLA-DR)
Identifiers	alpha *01:01
Symbol(s)	HLA-DRA
EBI-HLA	DRA*01:01
Identifiers	beta 1 *07:01
Symbol(s)	HLA-DRB1
EBI-HLA	DRB1*07:01
Shared data
Locus	chr.6 6p21.31

HLA-DR7 (DR7) is a HLA-DR serotype that recognizes the DRB1*0701 to *0705 gene products.

== Serology ==
DR7 serological recognition of the gene products of some DRB1*07 alleles
DRB1*	DR7	Sample
allele	%	size (N)
0701	99	7390
0704	>30%	1

The serological reaction of DR7 is excellent for *0701. The serology of *0703 to *0705 to *0709, and *0711 to *0714 serotypes is unknown. DRB1*0710N is a null allele. DRB1*0702 nomenclature has been deleted.

== Disease associations ==
=== By serotype ===
DR7 is positively associated with psoriasis vulgaris.

=== By Allele group ===
DRB1*07 is linked to T. cruzi infection with cardiomyopathy (also called Chaga's cardiomyopathy).

=== By extended haplotype ===
DR7:DQA1*0201:DQB1*0202 is associated with Graves' disease.

DR7-DQ2/DR5-DQ7 phenotype (transhaplotype encoded isoform DQα^{5}β^{2}) is the primary risk DQ isoform in celiac disease. DR7-DQ2/DR5-DQ7 (/DR11-DQ7 or /DR12-DQ7) is a clarifying identifier for the at risk transhaplotype.

DR53-DR7 may be associated with sclerosis/lupus associated anti-apolipoprotein antibodies.

== Genetic linkage ==
DR7 Haplotypes
Serotypes	DRA	DRB1	DRB4
DR7-DR53	*0101	*0701	*01
Serotypes	DQA1	DQB1	DRB1
DR7-DQ2 (2.2)	*0201	*0202	*0701
DR7-DQ9 (9.2, 3)	*0201	*0303	*0701
Serotypes	HLA-A	HLA-C	HLA-B	DRB1
A29(19)-Cw16-B44(16)-DR7	*2902	*1601	*4403	*0701
A30(19)-Cw6-B13-DR7	*3001	*0602	*1302	*0701
A33(19)-Cw7-B44(16)-DR7	*3301	*0701	*4403	*0701

HLA-DR7 is genetically linked HLA-DR53, and is linked to DQ2 serotypes. There are a few interesting genetics with DR7. The A29-Cw16-B44-DR7-DQ2 haplotype is in strong linkage disequilibrium particularly in Northwestern Europe. The highest frequencies tend to be coastal countries along the Atlantic. The Cw16 allele is undoubtedly derived from Western Africa the diversity and frequency of Cw16 declines away from the along the Greenwich longitudinal line. The level of linkage disequilibration about Cw16 postulates a recent arrival from Africa, and indicates a substantial contribution as far north as Ireland. The A33-Cw7-B44-DR7 offers the same scenario. This haplotype is found in Korea but not Japan, in fact Japan is an antinode of DR7. The most frequent A-B-DR-DQ haplotypes in Korea are found at ~3/4 the Korean frequencies in Japan, except A33-Cw7-B44-DR7-DQ2, which indicates that DR7 likely spread into Korea after the Japan's Yayoi migration when most of the Korean contribution occurred. Similarities with Mongol genes suggest that Central and East- Central Asian are the likely source, confirmed by the fact the haplotype is found in Pakistan, China and India. There is the possibility that this haplotype is a recent (Holocene) arrival from Africa or the Middle East to Central Asia as this best explains the alleles within the haplotype. The A19 (A29, A30, A31, A32, A33, A74) serotypes are very much enriched in sub-saharan and Western Africa, including Iberia, and disequilibrated components of DR7 show a tendency to be linked to A19 serotypes.
