= HLA-DR12 =

major histocompatibility complex, class II, DR12
Haplotypes groups	DQA*01:DRB1*1201 to DQA*01:DRB1*1203 DQA*01:DRB1*1206
Structure (See HLA-DR)
Identifiers	alpha *0101
Symbol(s)	HLA-DRA
EBI-HLA	DRA*0101
Identifiers	beta 1 *1201 to *1203 *1206
Symbol(s)	HLA-DRB1
EBI-HLA	DRB1*1201
EBI-HLA	DRB1*1202
EBI-HLA	DRB1*1203
EBI-HLA	DRB1*1306
Shared data
Locus	chr.6 6p21.31

HLA-DR12(DR12) is a HLA-DR serotype that recognizes the DRB1*1201 to *1203, *1206. DR12 serotype is a split antigen of the older HLA-DR5 serotype group which also contains the similar HLA-DR11 antigens.

== Serology ==
DR12, DR5 and DR11 serotype recognition of the gene products of some DRB1*12 alleles
DRB1*	DR12	DR5	DR11	Sample
allele	%	%	%	size (N)
1201	83	4	2	893
1202	89			162
1203	>50			3
1206	>50			2

The table above describes the efficiency of serological typing of DR12 and DR5. Serotypes are unknown the following alleles: DRB1*1204,*1205 to *1207 to *1215

== Alleles ==
There are only 2 common allels for DRB1*12, *1201 and *1202. *1202 is more common on the West Pacific Rim and particularly Indochina and the South Pacific.

== Disease associations ==
DR12 is associated with vulval lichen sclerosus, and undifferentiated spondyloarthritis.

DRB1*1201 is associated with iritis in juvenile arthritis, primary antiphospholipid syndrome, tiopronin intolerance in rheumatoid arthritis, adult chronic articular Still's disease

DRB1*1202 is found to be increased in narcolepsy associated sudden death syndrome in the Thai population, and narcolepsy in the Japanese population.

=== Extended linkage ===
DRB1*12:DQA1*0505:DQBA1*0301 haplotype: DR12-DQ7.5/DR7-DQ2.2 is a transhaplotype risk for coeliac disease

DRB1*1201:DRB3*01/03: colorectal cancer

== Genetic Linkage ==
DR12 Haplotypes
Serotypes	DRA	DRB1	DRB3
DR11(5)-DR52	*0101	*1201	*0101
DR11(5)-DR52	*0101	*1202	*0201
DR11(5)-DR52	*0101	*1202	*0202
DR11(5)-DR52	*0101	*1202	*0301
Serotypes	DRB1	DQA1	DQB1
DR12(5)-DQ7 (7.5, 3)	*1201	*0505	*0301
DR12(5)-DQ7 (7.5, 3)	*1202	*0505	*0301
DR12(5)-DQ7 (7.3, 3)	*1201	*0303	*0301
DR12(5)-DQ7 (7.4, 3)	*1201	*0401	*0301
DR12(5)-DQ7 (7.6, 3)	*1201	*0601	*0301
Serotypes	HLA-A	HLA-C	HLA-B	DRB1
A31(19)-Cw10-B51(5)-DR12(5)	*3101	*0304	*5101	*1202
A11-Cw9-B75(15)-DR12(5)	*1101	*0303	*1502	*1202
A2-Cw10-B13-DR12(5)	*0201	*0304	*1301	*1202

HLA-DR12 is genetically linked to DR52 and HLA-DQ7 serotypes.
