= HLA-DR4 =

Molecule triggering an immune response

human major histocompatibility complex, class II, DR4
Haplotypes groups	DRA*01:DRB1*04:01 to DRA*01:DRB1*04:13
Structure (See HLA-DR)
Identifiers	alpha *01:01
Symbol(s)	HLA-DRA
EBI-HLA	DRA*01:01
Identifiers	beta 1 *04:01 to *04:13
Symbol(s)	HLA-DRB1
EBI-HLA	DRB1*04:01
EBI-HLA	DRB1*04:02
EBI-HLA	DRB1*04:03
EBI-HLA	DRB1*04:04
EBI-HLA	DRB1*04:05
EBI-HLA	DRB1*04:06
EBI-HLA	DRB1*04:07
EBI-HLA	DRB1*04:08
EBI-HLA	DRB1*04:09
EBI-HLA	DRB1*0410
EBI-HLA	DRB1*0411
EBI-HLA	DRB1*0412
EBI-HLA	DRB1*0413
Shared data
Locus	chr.6 6p21.31

HLA-DR4 (DR4) is an HLA-DR serotype that recognizes the DRB1*04 gene products. The DR4 serogroup is large and has a number of moderate frequency alleles spread over large regions of the world.

== Serology ==
DR4 serological recognition of the gene products of some DRB1*04 alleles
DRB1*	DR4	Sample
allele	%	size (N)
04:01	98	5118
04:02	92	1029
04:03	92	748
04:04	89	2164
04:05	91	505
04:06	89	83
04:07	86	846
04:08	86	258
04:09	95	13
04:10	84	29
04:11	93	76
04:12	>50	1
04:13	>30	3

The serological identification of DR4 is good. The serology of DRB1*04:17 to *04:60 is unknown.

== Disease associations ==
=== By serotype ===
DR4 is associated with extraarticular rheumatoid arthritis, hydralazine-induced female systemic lupus erythematosus, pemphigoid gestationis, pemphigus foliaceus, obstructive hypertrophic cardiomyopathy, IgA nephropathy, 'shared syndrome'-systemic sclerosis/rheumatoid arthritis and polymyalgia rheumatica.

=== By allele ===
DRB1*04 is associated with increased risk for alopecia areata.

DRB1*04:01 is associated with multiple sclerosis, rheumatoid arthritis, type 1 diabetes, lyme disease induced arthritis. HLA-DRB1*04:01 gene variant is found three times more often in asymptomatic carriers of SARS-CoV-2 than in patients with symptoms of COVID-19. It is known that the prevalence of the HLA-DRB1*04:01 variant directly correlates with the latitude and longitude of the population. This variant of the gene is more common in northern and western Europe, which means that people of European descent are more likely to be asymptomatic carriers that can transmit the disease to more susceptible populations.

DRB1*04:02: drug-triggered/idiopathic pemphigus vulgaris, type 1 diabetes, SLE associated anti-cardiolipin and anti-β_{2} glycoprotein I.

DRB1*04:03: polycystic ovary syndrome, SLE associated anti-cardiolipin and anti-β_{2} glycoprotein I.

DRB1*04:04: anti-citrullinated fibrinogen in rheumatoid arthritis, autoimmune hepatitis.

DRB1*04:05: rheumatoid arthritis, Autoimmune hepatitis, type 1 diabetes.

DRB1*04:06: caspase-8 autoantibodies silicosis-systemic sclerosis (SSc)-systemic lupus erythematosus (SLE).

DRB1*04:09: T. cruzi infection with cardiomyopathy.

=== By haplotype ===
DR4-DQ8 is a risk factor for papillary thyroid carcinoma, juvenile diabetes, coeliac disease and rheumatoid arthritis.

DRB1*04:DQA1*03:03-DQB1*04:01 haplotype: type III autoimmune polyglandular syndrome, autoimmune hepatitis, autoimmune pancreatitis.

DRB1*04:DQA1*03-DQB1*03:02 haplotype: Type 1 diabetes with DRB1*04:01, *04:05, *04:02 increasing risk when DQ8 is present.

=== By genotype ===
DRB1*01:01/*04:04 and *01:01/*04:01 increases risk of mortality in rheumatoid arthritis, with ischemic heart disease and smoking. these same genotypes are associated with rheumatoid vasculitis.

== Genetic linkage ==
DR4 Haplotypes
Serotypes	DRA	DRB1	DRB4
DR4-DR53	*01:01	*04:01	*01:03
DR4-DR53	*01:01	*04:02	*01
DR4-DR53	*01:01	*04:03	*01
DR4-DR53	*01:01	*04:04	*01
DR4-DR53	*01:01	*04:05	*01
Serotypes	DQA1	DQB1	DRB1
DR4-DQ7 (7.3, 3)	*03:03	*03:01	*04:01
DR4-DQ7 (8.1, 3)	*03:01	*03:02	*04:01
DR4-DQ7 (8.1, 3)	*03:01	*03:02	*04:02
DR4-DQ7 (8.1, 3)	*03:01	*03:02	*04:04
DR4-DQ4 (4.3)	*03:03	*04:01	*04:05
Serotypes	HLA-A	HLA-C	HLA-B	DRB1
A2-Cw10-B62(15)-DR4	*02:01	*03:04	*1501	*04:01
A2-Cw10-B60(40)-DR4	*02:01	*03:04	*4001	*04:02
A2-Cw5-B44(16)-DR4	*02:01	*05:01	*44:02	*04:01
