= HLA-DR51 =

major histocompatibility complex, class II, DR51
Haplotypes groups	DRA*01:DRB5*01 DRA*01:DRB5*02
Structure (See HLA-DR)
Identifiers	alpha *0101
Symbol(s)	HLA-DRA
EBI-HLA	DRA*0101
Identifiers	beta 5 *01 *02
Symbol(s)	HLA-DRB5
EBI-HLA	DRB5*01
EBI-HLA	DRB5*02
Shared data
Locus	chr.6 6p21.31

HLA-DR51 is a HLA-DR serotype that recognizes the antigens encoded by the minor DR locus HLA-DRB5.

DRB3, DRB4, and DRB5 are minor DR beta encoding loci, they have been recognized as having distinct evolution, having diverged from DRB1 approximately 4 million years ago.

DRB5 locus is only apparent in a small subset of DR haplotypes, and most individuals lack DRB5.

== Alleles ==
DR52 recognition of some DRB3* alleles
DRB5*	DR51	?	Sample
allele	%	%	size (N)
0101	>71		28
0102	>86		8
0202	>86		13

DRB5* is subdivided into two allele groups, DRB5*01 and DRB5*02. B5*01 encodes 14 alleles and 11 isoforms. B5*02 encoded 4 alleles that can generate 4 isoforms. Only 3 of these have been surveyed by serotyping. There are numerous null genes at this locus.

DRB5*01 allele group

- 14 Alleles: 11 proteins, 2 Nulls
- DR51 Serotype: *0101, *0102
- Serotype unknown: *0103 to *0107, *0109, *0110 to *0113
- Nulls: *0108N, *0110N

DRB5*02 allele group

- 4 Alleles: 4 proteins
- DR51 Serotype: *0202,
- Serotype unknown: *0203 to *0205

== Associated diseases ==
DR51 serotype is positively associated with The following HLA-DRB5 alleles are associated with disease:

DRB5*0101:DRB1*1501 Multiple sclerosis, leprosy

=== DRB1 linkage ===
HLA-DRB5 (DR51)is linked to the following HLA-DR serotypes and DRB1 allele groups.

HLA-DR2

- HLA-DR15 - DRB1*15
- HLA-DR16 - DRB1*16
