= HLA-DR11 =

major histocompatibility complex, class II, DR11
Haplotypes groups	DQA*01:DRB1*1101 to DQA*01:DRB1*1111
Structure (See HLA-DR)
Identifiers	alpha *0101
Symbol(s)	HLA-DRA
EBI-HLA	DRA*0101
Identifiers	beta 1 *1101 to *1110
Symbol(s)	HLA-DRB1
EBI-HLA	DRB1*1101
EBI-HLA	DRB1*1102
EBI-HLA	DRB1*1103
EBI-HLA	DRB1*1104
EBI-HLA	DRB1*1105
EBI-HLA	DRB1*1106
Shared data
Locus	chr.6 6p21.31

HLA-DR11 (DR11) is a HLA-DR serotype that recognizes the DRB1*1101 to *1110. DR11 serotype is a split antigen of the older HLA-DR5 serotype group which also contains the similar HLA-DR12 antigens.

== Serology ==
DR11, DR5 and DR12 recognition of the gene products of some DRB1*11 alleles
DRB1*	DR11	DR5	DR12	Sample
allele	%	%	%	size (N)
1101	92	5		3474
1102	89	3		430
1103	89	4		397
1104	87	4		2119
1105	75			4
1106	20	73		15
1107	>50			1
1108	>50			2
1109	80	20		5

The table above describes the efficiency of serological typing of DR11 and DR5. Serotypes are unknown the following alleles: DRB1*1110 to *1157

== Disease associations ==
=== By serotype ===
DR11 is associated with grape anaphylaxis, well-differentiated thyroid cancer, low antibody production in Hepatitis C.

=== By allele(s) ===
DRB1*11 is associated systemic sclerosis (SSc) & anti-DNA topoisomerase I (anti-topo I) antibody

DRB1*1101 is associated Anti-Ro/SSA with anti-La/SSB antibodies in neonatal lupus erythematosus, mite sensitive asthma, cervical cancer risk (HPV?)

DRB1*1102: Tiopronin intolerance in rheumatoid arthritis

DRB1*1104: pauciarticular juvenile rheumatoid arthritis

=== By haplotype ===
DR11 is an identifier for the DR11-DQ7/DR7-DQ2 transhaplotype isoform of celiac disease. DR11-DQ7.5 is identified as a risk factor in rheumatic heart disease.

DRB1*1101:DQA1*0505:DQB1*0301 haplotype is associated with Anti-Ro/SSA with anti-La/SSB antibodies in neonatal lupus erythematosus, mite sensitive asthma

DRB1*1102:DQA1*0505:DQB1*0301 haplotype is associated with hepatitis B virus persistence

== Genetic Linkage ==
DR11 Haplotypes
Serotypes	DRA	DRB1	DRB3
DR11(5)-DR52	*0101	*1101	*02
DR11(5)-DR52	*0101	*1102	*02
DR11(5)-DR52	*0101	*1103	*02
DR11(5)-DR52	*0101	*1104	*02
Serotypes	DRB1	DQA1	DQB1
DR11(5)-DQ7 (7.5, 3)	*1101	*0505	*0301
DR11(5)-DQ7 (7.5, 3)	*1102	*0505	*0301
DR11(5)-DQ7 (7.5, 3)	*1103	*0505	*0301
DR11(5)-DQ7 (7.5, 3)	*1104	*0505	*0301
Serotypes	HLA-A	HLA-C	HLA-B	DRB1
A2-Cw7-B18-DR11	*0201	*0701	*1801	*1104
A24(9)-Cw4-B35-DR11	*2402	*0401	*3501	*1101
A24(9)-Cw14(BL)-B51(5)-DR11	*2402	*1402	*5101	*1104

HLA-DR11 is genetically linked to HLA-DR52 and HLA-DQ7(3) serotypes. The frequency node for DR11 is in the Levant and Anatolia. This serotype more than others appears to have spread with neolithization of Western Europe. The closely linked DQ7.5 appears to be protective against juvenile diabetes, in which wheat consumption appears to be a risk factor.
