= HLA-DR10 =

Serotype

major histocompatibility complex, class II, DR10
| Haplotypes groups | DQA*01:DRB1*1001 |
Structure (See HLA-DR)
| Identifiers | alpha *0101 |
| Symbol(s) | HLA-DRA |
| EBI-HLA | DRA*0101 |
| Identifiers | beta 1 *1001 |
| Symbol(s) | HLA-DRB1 |
| EBI-HLA | DRB1*1001 |
Shared data
| Locus | chr.6 6p21.31 |

HLA-DR10 (DR10) is a HLA-DR serotype that recognizes the DRB1*1001 gene product.

== Serology ==
DR10 serotype recognition of the DRB1*1001 allele gene product
| DRB1* | DR10 | DR1 | | Sample |
| allele | % | % | % | size (N) |
| 1001 | 90 | 4 | | 894 |

The serological reaction of DR10 is relatively good.

== Disease associations ==
=== By serotype ===
DR10 serotype or cognate alleles are associated with: Lichen planus

=== By allele ===
DRB1*1001 is associated with ovarian cancer and invasive squamous cell cervical cancer (SCC)

== Extended linkage ==
DRB1*1001:DQA1*01:DQB1*05 haplotype: Rheumatoid arthritis The primary involvement appears to be DR10.

== Genetic Linkage ==
DR10 Haplotypes
| | DRA | DRB1 |
| Haplotypes | *0101 | *1001 |
| | DQA1 | DQB1 | DRB1 |
| Haplotypes | *0101 | *0501 | *1001 |
| | HLA-A | HLA-B | DRB1 |
| Haplotypes | *0000 | *0000 | *1001 |

HLA-DR10 is not genetically linked to DR51, DR52 or DR53, but is linked to HLA-DQ1 and DQ5 serotypes. One haplotype found in caucasians is the HLA-A1-B37-Cw6-DR10-DQ5.
