= HLA-DR14 =

major histocompatibility complex, class II, DR14
Haplotypes groups	DRA*01:DRB1*1401 DRA*01:DRB1*1402 DRA*01:DRB1*1403 DRA*01:DRB1*1404 ....
Structure (See HLA-DR)
Identifiers	alpha *0101
Symbol(s)	HLA-DRA
EBI-HLA	DRA*0101
Identifiers	beta 1 *1401 to *1408 *1410
Symbol(s)	HLA-DRB1
EBI-HLA	DRB1*1401
EBI-HLA	DRB1*1402
EBI-HLA	DRB1*1403
EBI-HLA	DRB1*1404
EBI-HLA	DRB1*1405
EBI-HLA	DRB1*1406
Shared data
Locus	chr.6 6p21.31

HLA-DR14(DR14) is a HLA-DR serotype that recognizes the DRB1*1401 to *1408, *1410 to *1418, and other *14 gene products. DR14 serotype is a split antigen of the older HLA-DR6 serotype group which also contains the similar HLA-DR13 antigens.

== Alleles ==
DR14, DR6 and other serotype recognition of some DRB1*14 alleles
DRB1*
DR14
DR6
DR13
Sample
allele
%
%
%
size (N)
1401
74
14
3
1942
1402
61
13
9
204
1403
72
12
2
37
1404
79
8

80
1405
86
10

58
1406
37
15
22
117
1407
90

10
1408
25

4

1410
>75

4

Serotypes are unknown the following alleles: DRB1**1409, *1419 to *1462

== Disease associations ==
DRB1*1402: juvenile rheumatoid arthritis, increased longevity in Okinawans.

=== Extended linkage ===
DR*14:DQ5 haplotype: increased risk for non-AChR autoantibodies in myasthenia gravis.

== Genetic Linkage ==
DR14 Haplotypes
	DRA	DRB1	DRB3
DR14(6)-DR52	*0101	*1401	*0201
DR14(6)-DR52	*0101	*1402	*0201
DR14(6)-DR52	*0101	*1403	*0101
	DQA1	DQB1	DRB1
DR14-DQ5(5.3, 1)	*0104	*0503	*1401
	HLA-A	HLA-B	DRB1
A11-B35-DR14(6)	*1101	*3501	*1401
A2-B51(5)-DR14(6)	*0201	*5101	*1401

HLA-DR13 is genetically linked to HLA-DR52 and HLA-DQ5 (HLA-DQ1) serotypes.
