= ATA antibodies =

ATA antibodies may refer to:

- Anti-transglutaminase antibodies
- Anti-topoisomerase antibodies
- Anti-thyroglobulin antibodies
