= HUGO Gene Nomenclature Committee =

Committee for human gene name standards

HGNC

Content
- Description: HGNC is responsible for approving unique symbols and names for human loci, including protein coding genes, RNA genes and pseudogenes, to allow unambiguous scientific communication.
- Data types captured: Gene nomenclature
- Organisms: Human

Contact
- Research center: EMBL-EBI, UK;
- Primary citation: Braschi et al. (2019)

Access
- Website: www.genenames.org www.genenames.org/news
- Download URL: Statistics & Downloads; Custom Downloads; HGNC Biomart
- Web service URL: rest.genenames.org

Tools
- Web: HGNC Comparison of Orthology Predictions, Search

Miscellaneous
- Curation policy: Yes

The HUGO Gene Nomenclature Committee (HGNC) is a committee of the Human Genome Organisation (HUGO) that sets the standards for human gene nomenclature. The HGNC approves a unique name for every known human gene, based on a query of experts. In addition to the name, which is usually 1 to 10 words long, the HGNC also assigns a symbol (a short group of characters) to every gene. As with an SI symbol, a gene symbol is like an abbreviation but is more than that, being a second unique name that can stand on its own just as much as substitute for the longer name. It may not necessarily "stand for" the initials of the name, although many gene symbols do reflect that origin.

== Purpose ==
Full gene names, and especially gene abbreviations and symbols, are often not specific to a single gene. A marked example is CAP which can refer to any of 6 different genes (BRD4 , CAP1 , HACD1 , LNPEP , SERPINB6 , and SORBS1 ).

The HGNC short gene names, or gene symbols, unlike previously used or published symbols, are specifically assigned to one gene only. This can result in less common abbreviations being selected but reduces confusion as to which gene is referred to.

== Naming guidelines ==
The HGNC published its latest human gene naming guidelines in 2020. These may be summarized as:

1. gene symbols must be unique
2. symbols should only contain Latin letters and Arabic numerals
3. symbols should not contain punctuation or "G" for gene
4. symbols do not contain any reference to the species they are encoded in, i.e. "H/h" for human

The HGNC states that "gene nomenclature should evolve with new technology rather than be restrictive, as sometimes occurs when historical and single gene nomenclature systems are applied." The HGNC has also issued guides to specific locus types such as endogenous retroviral loci, structural variants and non-coding RNAs.

== Naming procedure ==
When assigning new gene nomenclature the HGNC make efforts to contact authors who have published on the human gene in question by email, and their responses to the proposed nomenclature are requested. HGNC also coordinates with the related Mouse and Rat Genomic Nomenclature Committees, other database curators, and experts for given specific gene families or sets of genes.

== Revision ==
The gene name revision procedure is similar to the naming procedure, but changing a standardized gene name after establishment of a consensus can create confusion, therefore the merit of this is controversial. For this reason the HGNC aims to change a gene name only if agreement for that change can be reached among a majority of researchers working on that gene.

== See also ==
- Human Genome Organisation (HUGO)
- Human Genome Project
- Human genome
- Gene
- Gene nomenclature

A complete list of all HGNC-approved gene symbols for protein-coding genes:

- List of human protein-coding genes 1
- List of human protein-coding genes 2
- List of human protein-coding genes 3
- List of human protein-coding genes 4
- List of human protein-coding genes 5
- List of human protein-coding genes 6
- List of human protein-coding genes 7
- List of human protein-coding genes 8
- List of human protein-coding genes 9
