= HLA-DR15 =

HLA-DR serotype

major histocompatibility complex, class II, DR15
Haplotypes groups	DRA*01:DRB1*1501 - to - DRA*01:DRB1*1505 DRA*01:DRB1*1507
Structure (See HLA-DR)
Identifiers	alpha *0101
Symbol(s)	HLA-DRA
EBI-HLA	DRA*0101
Identifiers	beta 1 *1501 to *1505 *1507
Symbol(s)	HLA-DRB1
EBI-HLA	DRB1*1501
EBI-HLA	DRB1*1502
EBI-HLA	DRB1*1503
EBI-HLA	DRB1*1504
EBI-HLA	DRB1*1505
EBI-HLA	DRB1*1507
Shared data
Locus	chr.6 6p21.31

HLA-DR15 (DR15) is a HLA-DR serotype that recognizes the DRB1*1501 to *1505 and *1507 gene products. DR15 is found at high levels from Ireland to Central Asia. DR15 is part of the older HLA-DR2 serotype group which also contains the similar HLA-DR16 antigens.

== Serology ==
DR15, DR2 and other serotype recognition of some DRB1*15 alleles
DRB1*	DR15	DR2	DR16	Sample
allele	%	%	%	size (N)
1501	76	23		6428
1502	77	16		676
1503	81	13		286
1504	>50			1
1505	>25			2
1507	>50			1

Serotypes are unknown for the following alleles: DRB1*1506, *1508 to *1516, *1518 to *1522. DRB1*1517N is a null.

== Disease associations ==
DR15 is positively associated Goodpasture syndrome, early age onset multiple sclerosis, pernicious anaemia, sarcoidosis, hypocretin deficiency associated narcolepsy and a predisposition for postmenopausal osteoporosis.

DRB1*1501 is positively associated with Goodpasture syndrome, juvenile rheumatoid arthritis, allergic bronchopulmonary aspergillosis, multiple sclerosis, systemic lupus erythematosus, cervical cancer (human papillomavirus infection), Sjögren syndrome associated with systemic lupus erythematosus, and intermediate uveitis.

DRB1*1502 is associated with systemic lupus erythematosus, systemic sclerosis (SSc) & anti-topoisomerase antibodies.

DRB1*1503 is associated with Chaga's cardiomyopathy, allergic bronchopulmonary aspergillosis, multiple sclerosis, cervical cancer (human papillomavirus infection).

=== Extended linkage ===
DRB1*15:DQA1*0102:DQB1*0602 haplotype us associated with cervical cancer risk in (human papillomavirus infection)

DRB1*1502:DQA1*????:DQB1*0501 haplotype is associated with systemic lupus erythematosus

== Genetic linkage ==
DR15 Haplotypes
Serotypes	DRA	DRB1	DRB5
DR15(2)-DR51	*0101	*1501	*0101
DR15(2)-DR51	*0101	*1502	*0101
DR15(2)-DR51	*0101	*1503	*0101
DR15(2)-DR51	*0101	*1504	*0101
DR15(2)-DR51	*0101	*1505	*0101
DR15(2)-DR51	*0101	*1507	*0101
	DQA1	DQB1	DRB1
DR15(2)-DQ6(6.2, 1)	*0102	*0602	*1501
DR15(2)-DQ6(6.1, 1)	*0103	*0601	*1502
	HLA-A	HLA-B	DRB1
A3-Cw7-B7-DR15(2)	*0301	*0702	*1501
A1-B51-DR15(2)	*0101	*5101	*1502

HLA-DR15 is genetically linked to HLA-DR51 and HLA-DQ6 (HLA-DQ1) serotypes.
