= HLA-DR53 =

major histocompatibility complex, class II, DR53
Haplotypes	DRA*01:DRB4*0101 DRA*01:DRB4*0102 DRA*01:DRB4*0103 DRA*01:DRB4*0104
Structure (See HLA-DR)
Identifiers	alpha *0101
Symbol(s)	HLA-DRA
EBI-HLA	DRA*0101
Identifiers	beta 4 *0101 *0102 *0103 *0104
Symbol(s)	HLA-DRB4
EBI-HLA	DRB4*0101
EBI-HLA	DRB4*0102
EBI-HLA	DRB4*0103
EBI-HLA	DRB4*0104
Shared data
Locus	chr.6 6p21.31

HLA-DR53 is an HLA-DR serotype that recognizes gene products of HLA-DRB4 locus. There are 13 alleles at this locus that encode 7 proteins.

DRB3, DRB4, and DRB5 are minor DR beta encoding loci, they have been recognized as having distinct evolution. and the DRB4 locus presence is linked to HLA-DR7 seropositivity. The DRB4*locus was apparently duplicated from an ancestor of the DRB1-DRB4 common locus around 5 million years ago.

DRB4 locus is only apparent in a small subset of DQ haplotypes, and most individuals lack DRB4. In addition the level of normal expression is 8 fold lower than the DRB1 in cells which can express both. and lowered because of both transcriptional and post-transcriptional regulation.

== Alleles ==
DR53 recognition of some DRB4* alleles
DRB4*	DR53	?	Sample
allele	%	%	size (N)
01:01	95		38
01:03	89		49

DR53 reactive alleles: DRB4*01:01, *01:03

Unknown reactivity: *01:02, *01:04 to *01:07

Null alleles: *01:03:01:02N, 02:01N, *03:01N

== Associated diseases ==
DRB4*01 is positively associated with Erythema multiforme, Crohn's disease, myasthenia gravis, rheumatoid arthritis Hashimoto's thyroiditis, vitiligo, primary biliary cirrhosis, clozapine-induced agranulocytosis, Vogt–Koyanagi–Harada disease,

== HLA-DRB1 linkage ==
HLA-DR53 serotypes (HLA-DRB4) is linked to the following HLADR serotypes (HLA-DRB1) allele groups:

HLA-DR4 - DRB1*04

HLA-DR7 - DRB1*07

HLA-DR9 - DRB1*09
