= DQ3 =

DQ3 may be:

- Deltora Quest 3, a children's book
- Dragon Quest III, a console role-playing game (RPG)
- HLA-DQ3, a human leukocyte antigen of the HLA-DQ type.
