= HLA-DR17 =

major histocompatibility complex, class II, DR17
Haplotypes groups	DRA*01:DRB1*0301 DRA*01:DRB1*0304
Structure (See HLA-DR)
Identifiers	alpha *0101
Symbol(s)	HLA-DRA
EBI-HLA	DRA*0101
Identifiers	beta 1 *0301 *0304
Symbol(s)	HLA-DRB1
EBI-HLA	DRB1*0301
EBI-HLA	DRB1*0304
Shared data
Locus	chr.6 6p21.31

HLA-DR17 (DR17) is an HLA-DR serotype that recognizes the DRB1*0301 and *0304 gene products. DR17 is found at high frequency in Western Europe (such as Western Ireland, N. Spain, Sardinia). DR17 is part of the broader antigen group HLA-DR3 and is very similar to the group HLA-DR18.

== Serology ==
DR17 and DR3 recognition of some DRB1*03 alleles
DRB1*	DR17	DR3	DR18	Sample
allele	%	%	%	size (N)
0301	64	33	0	9698
0304	20	60		5

DR17 recognizes the DRB1*0301, *0304 alleles.

== Disease associations ==
=== By serotype ===
DR17 is associated with non-chronic sarcoidosis, infantile spasm/epilepsy, rabies vaccine-induced autoimmune encephalomyelitis and cardiovascular hypertrophy in subjects with arterial hypertension People with DR17 show a tendency toward benzylpenicilloyl allergies.

=== By allele ===
DRB1*0301: diabetes mellitus type 1, myositis, early onset Graves disease, type 1 autoimmune hepatitis, inflammatory inclusion body myositis. In autoimmune hepatitis, DRB1*0301 correlates with more severe and difficult to treat disease.

=== By haplotype ===
DRB1*0301:DQA1*05:DQB1*0201 is associated with diabetes mellitus type 1, ovarian cancer, non-thymomic myasthenia gravis, idiopathic inflammatory myopathies, non-cancer associated Lambert-Eaton myasthenic syndrome and sarcoidosis

=== By phenotype ===
The DRB1*0301/DRB1*1501 heterozygote is linked to primary Sjögren's syndrome

== Genetic Linkage ==
DR17 Haplotypes
Serotypes	DRA	DRB1	DRB3
DR17	*0101	*0301	0101
DR17	*0101	*0301	0201
Serotypes	DQA1	DQB1	DRB1
DR17(3)-DQ2(2.5)	*0501	*0201	*0301
Serotypes	HLA-A	HLA C	HLA B	DRB1
A1-Cw7-B8-DR17(3)	*0101	*0701	*0801	*0301
A2-Cw7-B8-DR17(3)	*0201	*0701	*0801	*0301
A30-Cw5-B18-DR17(3)	*3002	*0501	*1801	*0301

HLA-DR17 is genetically linked to DR52 and HLA-DQ2 serotypes. These serotypes are the result of gene products from the HLA-DRB3* and HLA DQA1*0501 and HLA DQB1*0201 alleles. DRB1*0301 is frequently within by the "Super-B8" or ancestral HLA haplotype:

A*0101 : Cw*0701 : B*0801 : DRB1*0301 : DQA1*0501 : DQB1*0201

This haplotype is known as "Super B8", "European ancestral haplotype", or "AH8.1"
