= Anti-topoisomerase antibodies =

Autoantibodies

Autoantibody
Anti-Topoisomerase
Autoantigen; Isoform	Topoisomerase I (human)
Autoantigen gene	TOP1
Affected organ(s)	Dermis
Associated; Disease(s)	Scleroderma, Systemic sclerosis
Autoantibody; Ig Class	IgG, IgA
	DR2
HLA associations	DR15
	DR16
Other; Susceptibility genes	lymphoid protein tyrosine phos- phatase type 22 PTPN22

Anti-topoisomerase antibodies (ATA) are autoantibodies directed against topoisomerase and found in several diseases, most importantly scleroderma. Diseases with ATA are autoimmune disease because they react with self-proteins. They are also referred to as anti-DNA topoisomerase I antibody (anti-topo I).

== Epitopes and subtypes ==
Anti Scl-70 antibodies (also called anti-topoisomerase I after the type I topoisomerase target) is a type of antinuclear autoantibody seen mainly in diffuse systemic scleroderma, but is also seen the more limited form of systemic scleroderma called CREST syndrome. However, CREST syndrome is more closely associated with anti-centromere antibodies. Scl-70 antibodies are associated with more severe scleroderma disease.

Anti-topoisomerase antibodies can be classified according to their immunoglobulin class (IgM, IgG or IgA). IgG-ATA is found most frequently in scleroderma, with IgA being quite common but IgM very infrequent.

== Pathology ==
Topoisomerase I is an enzyme that relaxes the strain on DNA by nicking and ligating the DNA. ATA inhibits the activity of this enzyme. Since this activity occurs in the nucleus of the cell ATA is a form of antinuclear antibody. Scleroderma results from the overproduction of collagen in affected tissues, one study claims that there is an increased density of Topoisomerase I sites in the collagen genes, and that the antibodies may be altering transcription at these loci. ATA correlates with rapid progression of disease.

In systemic lupus erythematosus ATA are associated with nephritis.

Increases in ATA+ in scleroderma and SLE are associated with increases in serum CTLA4.

== Genetics ==
HLA-DR2 (DR15 and DR16) are associated with scleroderma and systemic sclerosis. It has been found that patients with ATA that recognize the ET4 domain of topoisomerase were frequently HLA-DR2, and in another population study it was found that DR-15 is associated with ATA in systemic sclerosis. In addition to HLA-DR, the protein tyrosine phosphatase, non-receptor type 22 (lymphoid) (1p13.2 - PTPN22), "CT/TT" genotype showed significant association with anti-topo I. The TAP1 gene (6p21.3, HLA complex) has also been found in association with ATA+ sclerosis.
