= DQ7 =

DQ7 may refer to:

- Dragon Quest VII, a video game.
- HLA-DQ7, an HLA-DQ receptor serotype in which the beta chain is encoded by DQB1*0301 gene.
