= HLA-DR13 =

major histocompatibility complex, class II, DR13
Haplotypes groups	DQA*01:DRB1*1301 to DQA*01:DRB1*1309 DQA*01:DRB1*1310 DQA*01:DRB1*1312 ....
Structure (See HLA-DR)
Identifiers	alpha *0101
Symbol(s)	HLA-DRA
EBI-HLA	DRA*0101
Identifiers	beta 1 *1301 to *1308 *1310
Symbol(s)	HLA-DRB1
EBI-HLA	DRB1*1301
EBI-HLA	DRB1*1302
EBI-HLA	DRB1*1304
EBI-HLA	DRB1*1306
EBI-HLA	DRB1*1307
EBI-HLA	DRB1*1310
Shared data
Locus	chr.6 6p21.31

HLA-DR13(DR13) is a HLA-DR serotype that recognizes the DRB1*1301 to *13082, *1310 and some other *13 gene products. DR13 serotype is a split antigen of the older HLA-DR6 serotype group which also contains the similar HLA-DR14 antigens.

== Alleles ==
DR13, DR6 and other serotype recognition of some DRB1*13 alleles
DRB1*	DR13	DR6	DR14	Sample
allele	%	%	%	size (N)
1301	81	14	1	3788
1302	74	17	2	3081
1303	69	10	2	948
1304	87			127
1305	54	12		305
1306	78			9
1307	>50			1
1308	45	55		9
1310	>75			5

Serotypes are unknown the following alleles: DRB1*1309, *1315 to *1379 DRB1*13 allele group

- 81 Alleles: 74 proteins
- DR13 (weak or no DR6) Serotype: *1301, *1302, *1304, *1306, *1307, *1310, *1312 to *1314
- DR6 (weak DR13) Serotype: *1308
- DR13&Other serotypes: *1303, *1305, *1311,
- Serotype unknown: *1309, *1315 to *1374

== Disease associations ==
DRB1*1302 is linked to early childhood myastenia gravis. Alleles of DR13 along with immunization for hepatitis B and C are most protective against the disease.

=== Extended linkage ===
DRB1*1302:DQA1*0102:DQB1*0604 Early childhood myastenia gravis

== Genetic Linkage ==
DR13 Haplotypes
	DRA	DRB1	DRB3
DR13(6)-DR52	*0101	*1301	*0101
DR13(6)-DR52	*0101	*1301	*0201
DR13(6)-DR52	*0101	*1302	*0301
	DQA1	DQB1	DRB1
DR13(6)-DQ6(6.3, 1)	*0103	*0603	*1301
DR13(6)-DQ6(6.4, 1)	*0102	*0604	*1302
DR13(6)-DQ6(6.5, 1)	*0102	*0605	*1302
DR13(6)-DQ6(6.9, 1)	*0102	*0609	*1302
	HLA-A	HLA-B	DRB1
A2-Cw5-B44(16)-DR13	*02	*4402	*1301

HLA-DR13 is genetically linked to DR52 and HLA-DQ6 (HLA-DQ1) serotypes.
