= HLA-DR =

Subclass of HLA-D antigens that consist of alpha and beta chains

MHC class II, DR
- (heterodimer)
- Illustration of DR with bound ligand (yellow)
- Protein type: cell surface receptor
- Function: Immune recognition and antigen presentation
Subunit name	Gene	Chromosomal locus
α	HLA-DRA	Chromosome 6p21.31
β1	HLA-DRB1	" "
β3	HLA-DRB3	" "
β4	HLA-DRB4	" "
β5	HLA-DRB5	" "

HLA-DR is an MHC class II cell surface receptor encoded by the human leukocyte antigen complex on chromosome 6 region 6p21.31. The complex of HLA-DR (Human Leukocyte Antigen – DR isotype) and peptide, generally between 9 and 30 amino acids in length, constitutes a ligand for the T-cell receptor (TCR). HLA (human leukocyte antigens) were originally defined as cell surface antigens that mediate graft-versus-host disease. Identification of these antigens has led to greater success and longevity in organ transplant.

Antigens most responsible for graft loss are HLA-DR (first six months), HLA-B (first two years), and HLA-A (long-term survival). Good matching of these antigens between host and donor is most critical for achieving graft survival.

HLA-DR is also involved in several autoimmune conditions, disease susceptibility and disease resistance. It is also closely linked to HLA-DQ and this linkage often makes it difficult to resolve the more causative factor in disease.

HLA-DR molecules are upregulated in response to signalling. In the instance of an infection, the peptide (such as the staphylococcal enterotoxin I peptide) is bound into a DR molecule and presented to a few of a great many T-cell receptors found on T-helper cells. These cells then bind to antigens on the surface of B-cells stimulating B-cell proliferation.

== Function ==
Illustration of DR receptor presenting antigen to TCR on T-helper cell

The primary function of HLA-DR is to present peptide antigens, potentially foreign in origin, to the immune system for the purpose of eliciting or suppressing T-(helper)-cell responses that eventually lead to the production of antibodies against the same peptide antigen. Antigen-presenting cells (macrophages, B-cells and dendritic cells) are the cells in which DR are typically found. Increased abundance of DR 'antigen' on the cell surface is often in response to stimulation, and, therefore, DR is also a marker for immune stimulation.

== Structure ==
HLA-DR is an αβ heterodimer, cell surface receptor, each subunit of which contains two extracellular domains, a membrane-spanning domain and a cytoplasmic tail. Both α and β chains are anchored in the membrane. The N-terminal domain of the mature protein forms an alpha-helix that constitutes the exposed part of the binding groove, the C-terminal cytoplasmic region interact with the other chain forming a beta-sheet under the binding groove spanning to the cell membrane. The majority of the peptide contact positions are in the first 80 residues of each chain.

== Genetics ==
The genetics of HLA-DR is complex. HLA-DR is encoded by several loci and several 'genes' of different function at each locus. The DR α-chain is encoded by the HLA-DRA locus. Unlike the other DR loci, functional variation in mature DRA gene products is absent. (Note: see table Number of Variant Alleles HLA-DR Loci) This reduces the potential functional combinations from ~1400 to ~400 ([table is not exact because new alleles are continually being added; not all new alleles are functional variants of the mature subunits]).

28 (of 75) Most common DR-DQ haplotypes in Americans of European descent
DR	DR-DQ	DR	DQ		Freq
Serotype	haplotype	B1	A1	B1	%
DR1	DR1-DQ5	01:01	01:01	05:01	9.	1
DR1	DR1-DQ5	01:02	01:01	05:01	1.	4
DR1	DR1-DQ5	01:03	01:01	05:01	0.	5
DR3	DR3-DQ2	03:01	05:01	02:01	13.	1
DR4	DR4-DQ7	04:01	0300	03:01	5.	4
DR4	DR4-DQ7	04:07	0300	03:01	0.	9
DR4	DR4-DQ8	04:01	0300	03:02	5.	0
DR4	DR4-DQ8	04:02	0300	03:02	1.	0
DR4	DR4-DQ8	04:03	0300	03:02	0.	4
DR4	DR4-DQ8	04:04	0300	03:02	3.	9
DR4	DR4-DQ8	04:05	0300	03:02	0.	3
DR7	DR7-DQ2	07:01	02:01	02:02	11.	1
DR7	DR7-DQ9	07:01	02:01	03:03	3.	7
DR8	DR8-DQ4	08:01	04:01	04:02	2.	2
DR8	DR8-DQ7	08:03	06:01	03:01	0.	1
DR9	DR9-DQ9	09:01	0300	03:03	0.	8
DR10	DR10-DQ5	10:01	01:04	05:01	0.	7
DR11	DR11-DQ7	11:01	05:05	03:01	5.	6
DR11	DR11-DQ7	11:03	05:05	03:01	0.	3
DR11	DR11-DQ7	11:04	05:05	03:01	2.	7
DR12	DR12-DQ7	12:01	05:05	03:01	1.	1
DR13	DR13-DQ6	13:01	01:03	06:03	5.	6
DR13	DR13-DQ6	13:02	01:02	06:04	3.	4
DR13	DR13-DQ6	13:02	01:02	06:09	0.	7
DR13	DR13-DQ7	13:03	05:05	03:01	0.	7
DR14	DR14-DQ5	14:01	01:04	05:03	2.	0
DR15	DR15-DQ6	15:01	01:02	06:02	14.	2
DR15	DR15-DQ6	15:02	01:03	06:01	0.	7
DR16	DR16-DQ5	16:01	01:02	05:02	1.	0

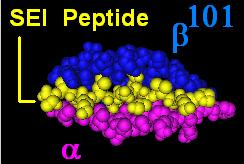
ligand (Staphylococcal enterotoxin 1-C peptide:pkyvkqntlklat) within the binding pocket of DR αβ^{101}

The DR β-chain is encoded by 4 loci, however no more than 3 functional loci are present in a single individual, and no more than two on a single chromosome. Sometimes an individual may only possess 2 copies of the same locus, DRB1*. The HLA-DRB1 locus is ubiquitous and encodes a very large number of functionally variable gene products (HLA-DR1 to HLA-DR17). The HLA-DRB3 locus encodes the HLA-DR52 specificity, is moderately variable and is variably associated with certain HLA-DRB1 types. The HLA-DRB4 locus encodes the HLA-DR53 specificity, has some variation, and is associated with certain HLA-DRB1 types. The HLA-DRB5 locus encodes the HLA-DR51 specificity, which is typically invariable, and is linked to the HLA-DR2 types.

- linkage (See Table)
  - DQA1 and DQB1
    - Linkage disequilibrium exists for many DR-DQ types.
  - Nomenclature issues. Some older studies may refer to DR15 or 16 as DR2 and DQ5 and DQ6 as DQ1 therefore a haplotype DR2-DQ1 is usually referring to DR15-DQ6 but could be referring to DR16-DQ5. DR5 is used to refer to DR11 and DR12, in which case DQ3 might be used. In these instances DQ3 almost always can be interpreted as DQ7, but DR5 is most often DR11 and less frequently DR12. Similar issues exist for DR6 versus DR13 and DR14. DR6-DQ1 can refer to either DR13-DQ6 or less frequently DR14-DQ5, but DR6-DQ3 or DR6-DQ7 generally refers to DR13-DQ7. Even older literature has more confusing designations. By looking at the change of disease association with improved testing we can see how HLA nomenclature has evolved over time.

Number of Variant Alleles HLA-DR Loci
HLA-DR
HLA	-A1	-B1	-B3 to -B5^{1}	Potential
Locus	#	#	#	Combinations
Alleles	3	463	74	1635
Unique Polypeptide	2	394	57	902
Contact Variant	1	~300	~30	~330
^{1}DRB3, DRB4, DRB5 have variable presence in humans

=== Evolution and allele frequencies ===
There is a high level of allelic diversity at HLA DRB1, it is second only to HLA-B locus in number of allelic variants. These two loci are highest sequence variation rate within human genome. This means HLA-DRB1 is rapidly evolving, much more rapidly than almost all other protein encoding loci. Much of the variation at HLA DRB1 occurs at peptide contact positions in the binding groove, as a result many of the alleles alter the way the DR binds peptide ligands and changes the repertoire each receptor can bind. This means that most of the changes are functional in nature, and therefore are under selection. In the HLA region, genes are under heterozygous or balancing selection, although certain alleles appear to be under positive or negative selection, either in the past or present

HLA generally evolve through a process of gene conversion, which is a form of short distance or 'abortive' genetic recombination. Functional motifs in genes are exchanged to form new alleles, and frequently new, functionally different DR isoforms. HLA-DR represents an extreme example of this. A survey of X-linked loci reveals that most human loci have undergone fixation within the last 600,000 years, and diploid loci have undergone significant proportion of fixation in that period of time.

The level of deep branching at X-linked loci indicates loci were close to fixation or fixed at the end of the human population bottleneck 100,000 to 150,000 years ago. The HLA-DR locus represents a major exception to this observation. Based on distribution of major groupings in the human population it is possible to assert that more than a dozen major variants survived the population bottleneck. This observation is supported by the concept of a heterozygous selection coefficient operating on the HLA-DR, and at the HLA-DRB1 locus to a greater degree relative to HLA-DQB1 and HLA-DPB1. Most of the HLA alleles currently present in the human population can be explained by gene conversion between these ancient ancestral types, some that persist into the extant population.

== Serogroups ==
Subpages for DR serotypes
Serotypes of HLA-DRB1 gene products
	Split antigens	
HLA-DR1		
HLA-DR2	HLA-DR15	HLA-DR16
HLA-DR3	HLA-DR17	HLA-DR18
HLA-DR4		
HLA-DR5	HLA-DR11	HLA-DR12
HLA-DR6	HLA-DR13	HLA-DR14
HLA-DR7		
HLA-DR8		
HLA-DR9		
HLA-DR10		

The table below provides links to subpages with information about distribution, genetic linkage and disease association for the HLA-DR serogroups.

== Interlocus DRB linkage ==
DRB1 is linked with other DRB loci in four ways.

DR1 to DR18 genetic linkage to DR51, DR52, and DR53
non-DRB1	linked DRB1 antigens			
antigens	antigens			
None	DR1	DR8	DR10	
DR51	DR2	DR15	DR16	
DR52	DR3	DR17	DR18	
DR52	DR5	DR11	DR12	
DR52	DR6	DR13	DR14	
DR53	DR4	DR7	DR8	DR9

Diseases associated with HLA-DR and links to DR subpages(V - T)
Class	Disease	Associated DR	2	3	4
	alopecia areata	DR5			
anemia	pernicious	DR15			
	antiphospholipid syndrome, primary	DR5	DR12		
aneurysm	coronary artery	DR16			
arteritis	Takayasu's	DR16			
arthritis, rheumatoid	juvenile	DR4	DR5	DR14	DR15
arthritis, rheumatoid	pauciarticular, juv.	DR8			
arthritis, rheumatoid	Still's disease	DR12			
arthritis, rheumatoid	iritis w/juv. arthritis	DR12			
arthritis, rheumatoid	seropositive	DR1	DR4	DR10	
arthritis, rheumatoid	w/systemic sclerosis	DR1			
arthritis, rheumatoid	lyme disease induced	DR4			
arthritis, rheumatoid	tiopronin intolerance	DR5	DR11	DR12	
cardiomyopathy	hypertrophic	DR4	DR17		
cardiomyopathy	T. cruzi induced	DR4	DR7	DR15	
colitis	Crohn's	DR1			
colitis	ulcerative	DR1			
diabetes	juvenile (type 1)	DR3	DR4	DR17	DR18
diabetes	fatty liver (type 2)	DR8			
encephalomyelitis	rabies vaccine-induced	DR17			
encephalopathy	acute necrotizing	DR52			
epilepsy	childhood	DR5			
epilepsy	infantile/spasm	DR17			
heart disease	rheumatic	DR16			
hepatitis	autoimmune	DR2	DR4	DR17	
hepatitis	primary biliary cirrhosis	DR2	DR8		
hepatitis	chronic type C	DR11			
	lichen planus	DR1	DR10		
lupus,	systemic	DR3	DR4	DR52	
lupus,	hydralazine-induced	DR4			
lupus,	with Sjögren syndrome	DR15			
lymphadenopathy	generalized	DR5			
lymphoma,	mycosis fungoides	DR5			
	melioidosis	DR16			
myasthenia	gravis	DR3	DR6	DR13	DR14
myasthenia	penicillamine-induced	DR1			
myositis	inflammatory inclusion body	DR17	DR18	DR52	
	narcolepsy	DR2	DR12		
nephritis,	tubulointerstitial	DR1			
nephropathy	IgA-mediated	DR4			
	polyglandular deficiency syndrome	DR5			
pemphigus	foliaceous	DR1			
pemphigus	vulgaris	DR4			
psoriasis	vulgaris	DR1	DR7		
papillomatosis,	respiratory	DR1			
sarcoidosis	non-chronic	DR17	DR52		
sclerosis,	multiple	DR2	DR15	DR53	
sclerosis,	"bout onset" multiple	DR3			
sclerosis,	systemic	DR4	DR11	DR16	DR52
sclerosis,	vulval lichen	DR12			
schizophrenia		DR1			
susceptibility	leprosy	DR2			
susceptibility	tuberculosis	DR2			
susceptibility	ragweed Ra6 allergy	DR5			
susceptibility	asthma, mite sensitive	DR11			
susceptibility	2ndary infection, AIDS	DR3			
susceptibility	aspergillosis	DR15			
susceptibility	Kaposi's sarcoma	DR5			
susceptibility	thyroid carcinomas	DR8	DR11		
susceptibility	ovarian/cervical cancer	DR10	DR11	DR15	
susceptibility	grape induced anaphylaxis	DR11			
susceptibility	Chlamydia pneumoniae	DR52			
thyroiditis	Hashimoto's	DR3	DR5		
thyroiditis	Graves'	DR3	DR17	DR52	
uveitis	tubulointerstitial	DR1			
^{*}references are provided on linked subpages
