= HLA-DR8 =

human major histocompatibility complex, class II, DR8
Haplotypes groups	DQA*01:DRB1*0801 to DQA*01:DRB1*0806
Structure (See HLA-DR)
Identifiers	alpha *0101
Symbol(s)	HLA-DRA
EBI-HLA	DRA*0101
Identifiers	beta 1 *0801 to *0806
Symbol(s)	HLA-DRB1
EBI-HLA	DRB1*0801
EBI-HLA	DRB1*0802
EBI-HLA	DRB1*0803
EBI-HLA	DRB1*0804
EBI-HLA	DRB1*0805
EBI-HLA	DRB1*0806
Shared data
Locus	chr.6 6p21.31

HLA-DR8 (DR8) is a HLA-DR serotype that recognizes the DRB1*0801 to *0807, and *0810 to *0812 gene products.

== Serology ==
DR8 serological recognition of the gene products of some DRB1*08 alleles
DRB1*	DR8	Sample
allele	%	size (N)
0801	95	1076
0802	96	265
0803	88	230
0804	93	186
0805	>60	5
0806	>75	13

The serological reaction of DR8 is relatively good. The serology of DRB1*0808, *0809 and *0813 to *0832 serotypes is unknown.

== Disease associations ==
DR8 is linked to papillary thyroid carcinomas, early onset pauciarticular juvenile chronic arthritis, primary biliary cirrhosis

=== by allele ===
HLA-DRB1*0801 is linked to primary biliary cirrhosis In Mexicans DR8 is found more often in type-2 juvenile diabetes.

HLA-DRB1*0803 is also linked to primary biliary cirrhosis

== Genetic Linkage ==
DR8 Haplotypes
	DRA	DRB1
Haplotypes	*0101	*0801	*0101
	DQA1	DQB1	DRB1
Haplotypes	*0401	*0402	*0801
	HLA-A	HLA-B	DRB1
Haplotypes	*0000	*0000	*0801

HLA-DR8 is not genetically linked to HLA-DR51 to DR53, but is linked to DQ4 serotypes.
