= HLA-DR16 =

major histocompatibility complex, class II, DR16
Haplotypes groups	DRA*01:DRB1*1601 DRA*01:DRB1*1602
Structure (See HLA-DR)
Identifiers	alpha *0101
Symbol(s)	HLA-DRA
EBI-HLA	DRA*0101
Identifiers	beta 1 *1601 *1602 *1604
Symbol(s)	HLA-DRB1
EBI-HLA	DRB1*1601
EBI-HLA	DRB1*1602
EBI-HLA	DRB1*1604
Shared data
Locus	chr.6 6p21.31

HLA-DR16(DR16) is a HLA-DR serotype that recognizes the DRB1*1601, *1602 and *1604 gene products. DR16 is found in the Mediterranean at modest frequencies. DR16 is part of the older HLA-DR2 serotype group which also contains the similar HLA-DR15 antigens.

== Alleles ==
DR16, DR2 and other serotype recognition of some DRB1*16 alleles
DRB1*	DR16	DR2	DR15	Sample
allele	%	%	%	size (N)
1601	41	29	19	703
1602	47	30	16	239
1604	>50			1

== Disease associations ==
DR16 is associated with Chaga's cardiomyopathy, rheumatic heart disease, coronary artery ectasia, and chronic discoid lupus erythematosus.

DRB1*1601 is associated with tuberculosis risk

DRB1*1602: Juvenile rheumatoid arthritis, rheumatic heart disease, Takayasu arteritis, systemic sclerosis (SSc) & anti-DNA topoisomerase I (anti-topo I) antibody, melioidosis (Burkholderia pseudomallei infection)

=== Extended linkage ===
DRB1*1601:DQA1*0102:DQB1*0502 haplotype is associated with tubeculousis risk

  - *1602:DQA1*0102:DQB1*0502 haplotype: graves disease, cervical cancer (human papilloma virus infection), scleroderma
  - *1602:DQA1*05:DQB1*0301 haplotype: rheumatic heart disease, systemic sclerosis

== Genetic Linkage ==
DR16 Haplotypes
Serotypes	DRA	DRB1	DRB5
DR16(2)-DR51	*0101	*1601	*0101
DR16(2)-DR51	*0101	*1602	*0101
DR16(2)-DR51	*0101	*1604	*0101
	DQA1	DQB1	DRB1
DR16(2)-DQ5 (5.2, 1)	*0102	*0502	*1601
	HLA-A	HLA-B	DRB1
A2-B51(5)-DR16(2)	*0201	*5101	*1601

HLA-DR16 is genetically linked to HLA-DR51 and HLA-DQ5 serotypes.
