= Ira Carmen =

American political scientist (born 1934)

Ira Harris Carmen (born December 3, 1934) graduated from the University of Michigan and is an American Professor Emeritus of Political Science at the University of Illinois at Urbana-Champaign, where he taught from 1968 to 2009.

Carmen is a co-founder of the social science subdiscipline of genetics and politics. The first political scientist to be elected to the Human Genome Organization, he is a member of two research teams at the University of Illinois, one exploring sociogenomics and the other stem cell research.

After 41 years of service, Professor Carmen retired on August 24, 2009.

== Research ==
- Cloning and the Constitution: An Inquiry into Governmental Policymaking and Genetic Experimentation
- Politics in the Laboratory: The Constitution of Human Genomics
- Power & Balance: An Introduction to American Constitutional Government
- Movies, Censorship, and the Law
