= Ada Hamosh =

American pediatrician and geneticist

Ada Hamosh (born 1960) is an American pediatrician and geneticist. She is the Frank V. Sutland Professor of Genetics in the Departments of Genetic Medicine and Pediatrics at the Johns Hopkins University. She is a physician-scientist known for resources she created for researchers and clinicians globally.

== Early life and education ==
Hamosh was born in Jerusalem in 1960 to a biochemist mother and pulmonologist father. She grew up in Bethesda, Maryland with a mailbox that said 'Paul Hamosh, MD, Margit Hamosh, PhD, and Ada Hamosh, KID.' After college at Wesleyan and medical school at Georgetown, she chose Johns Hopkins for her pediatrics residency and subsequent genetics fellowship.

== Career ==
Hamosh assumed the position of scientific director of Online Mendelian Inheritance in Man (OMIM®). She served as co-chair of the phenotype review committee of the Baylor-Hopkins Centers for Mendelian Genomics (CMG), a National Human Genome Research Institute-funded project to identify disease genes. She helped developed PhenoDB, a web-based phenotype and genotype platform that is freely available for clinical and research use, and associated tools including GeneMatcher and Matchmaker Exchange.

Her tools have contributed to medical education and connected clinicians with basic scientists and model organism experts, enabling them to study variants of uncertain significance. Those collaborations have led to gene discovery and have facilitated understanding of rare diseases and phenotypes.

Hamosh published dozens of papers on genetic disorders. She served on the Human Variome Project, the ClinGen Project, the International Rare Disease Research Consortium, the Gene Curation Coalition, and the Global Alliance for Genomic Health. She became President of the Human Genome Organization (HUGO) in 2023.

== Awards ==
- American Society for Human Genetics (ASHG) Education Award, 2024.
- National Organization for Rare Disorders (NORD) Rare Impact Award, 2023.
- David L. Rimoin Lifetime Achievement Award in Medical Genetics from the ACMG Foundation for Genetic and Genomic Medicine, 2021.

== Personal life ==
Hamosh's sisters both became physicians. Her husband, Dr. Hal Dietz, is also a pediatrician and physician-scientist.
