= HLA-DR2 =

Antigen serotype

Illustration of HLA-DR

HLA-DR2 (DR2) of the HLA-DR serotype system, is a broad antigen serotype that is now preferentially covered by HLA-DR15 and HLA-DR16 serotype group. This serotype primarily recognizes gene products of the HLA-DRB1*15 and HLA-DRB1*16 allele groups.

== Serology ==
DR15, DR2 and other serotype recognition of some DRB1*15 alleles
DRB1*	DR15	DR2	DR16	Sample
allele	%	%	%	size (N)
15:01	76	23		6428
15:02	77	16		676
15:03	81	13		286
15:04	>50			1
15:05	>25			2
15:07	>50			1
				.
	DR16	DR2	DR15	N
16:01	41	29	19	703
16:02	47	30	16	239
16:04	>50			1

== Disease associations ==
DR2 serotypes are associated with Goodpasture syndrome, systemic lupus erythematosus, multiple sclerosis, narcolepsy, tuberculoid leprosy (multi-drug-resistant tuberculosis or leprosy), ulcerative colitis (Japanese), primary biliary cirrhosis and autoimmune hepatitis. DR2 is also found in all patients that test positive for anti-Asn-RNA-synthetase and chronic interstitial lung disease.

== Genetic linkage ==
DR2 is linked to the HLA-DR51.
