= HLA-DR6 =

Broad-antigen serotype

Illustration of HLA-DR

HLA-DR6 (DR6) is a broad-antigen serotype that is further split into HLA-DR13 and HLA-DR14 antigen serotypes.

== Serology ==
DR13, DR6 and other serotype recognition of some DRB1*13 and DRB1*14 alleles
DRB1*	DR13	DR6	DR14	Sample
allele	%	%	%	size (N)
1301	81	14	1	3788
1302	74	17	2	3081
1303	69	10	2	948
1304	87			127
1305	54	12		305
1306	78			9
1307	>50			1
1308	45	55		9
1310	>75			5
DRB1*	DR14	DR6	DR13	N
1401	74	14	3	1942
1402	61	13	9	204
1403	72	12	2	37
1404	79	8		80
1405	86	10		58
1406	37	15	22	117
1407	90			10
1408	25			4
1410	>75			4

DR6 serological reactivity is relatively poor compared to other serological tests for DR antigens. Compare to DQ2 or DR7.

== Disease associations ==
DR13 and DR14 share a common association to myasthenia gravis.

== Allele groups ==
HLA-DRB1*13 and HLA-DRB1*14 encode serotypes of DR6.
