= HLA-DR18 =

major histocompatibility complex, class II, DR18
Haplotypes groups	DRA*01:DRB1*0302 DRA*01:DRB5*0303
Structure (See HLA-DR)
Identifiers	alpha *0101
Symbol(s)	HLA-DRA
EBI-HLA	DRA*0101
Identifiers	beta 1 *0302 *0303
Symbol(s)	HLA-DRB1
EBI-HLA	DRB5*0302
EBI-HLA	DRB1*0303
Shared data
Locus	chr.6 6p21.31

HLA-DR18 (DR18) is a HLA-DR serotype that recognizes the DRB1*0302 and *0303 gene products. Compared to DR17 which is found at high frequency in Western Europe, DR18 is found more in SE Europe and Central Asia.

== Serology ==
DR18 recognition of some DRB1*03 alleles
DRB1*	DR18	DR3	DR17	Sample
allele	%	%	%	size (N)
0302	66	24	3	317
0303	60	40		5

DR18 recognizes the DRB1*0302 and *0303; the thoroughness of recognition is fair, but better than DR3.

== Disease associations ==
DR18 seropositivity is associated with rheumatoid polyarthritis

DRB1*0302 is positively associated with juvenile diabetes, nuclear helicase Mi-2 autoantibodies in inflammatory inclusion body myositis.

== Genetic Linkage ==
DR18 Haplotypes
Serotypes	DRA	DRB1	DRB3
DR18(3)-DR52	*0101	*0302	*0101
	DQA1	DQB1	DRB1
D18(3)-DQ2(2.5)	*0501	*0201	*0302
	HLA-A	HLA -B	DRB1
A33-B58-DR18(3)	*3301	*5801	*0302

HLA-DR18 is genetically linked to DR52 and HLA-DQ2 serotypes. These serotypes are the result of gene products from the HLA-DRB3* and HLA DQA1*0501 and HLA DQB1*0201 alleles.
