= HLA-DQ3 =

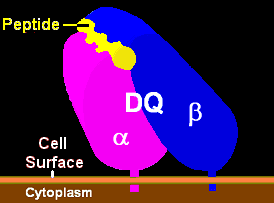
major histocompatibility complex, class II, DQ3
Haplotypes	DQA1*0303:DQB1*0301 DQA1*0401:DQB1*0301 DQA1*0505:DQB1*0301 DQA1*0601:DQB1*0301 DQA1*03:DQB1*0302 DQA1*0301:DQB1*0303
Structure (See HLA-DQ)
Identifiers	alpha 1 *0301 *0302 *0303 *0401 *0505 *0601
Symbol(s)	HLA-DQA1
EBI-HLA	DQA1*0301
EBI-HLA	DQA1*0302
EBI-HLA	DQA1*0303
EBI-HLA	DQA1*0401
EBI-HLA	DQA1*0505
Identifiers	beta 1 *0301 *0302 *0303
Symbol(s)	HLA-DQB1
EBI-HLA	DQB1*0301
EBI-HLA	DQB1*0302
EBI-HLA	DQB1*0303
Shared data
Locus	chr.6 6p21.31

Within molecular and cell biology, HLA-DQ3 (DQ3) is a broad serotype category with split antigens HLA-DQ7, DQ8, and DQ9. Historically, originally recognized as MB3 a DC4 serotype, DQw3 was one of three early determined antigens recognized as HLA-DQ along with HLA-DQ1 and HLA-DQ2. While the DQ3 molecules are structurally similar in beta chain, the DQ molecules differ markedly in function, even when present with the same DQ alpha subunit. For this reason they are best treated independently.

== Serology ==
DQ3, DQ7, DQ8, and DQ9 recognition of Some DRB1*and
DQB1*	DQ7	DQ3	DQ8	Sample
allele	%	%	%	size (N)
0301	85	40	1	12220
0304	40	35	8	111
				.
	DQ8	DQ3	DQ7	N
0302	66	25	1	6657
0305	34	30		70
	DQ9	DQ3	DQ2	N
0303	67	12	11
		DQ7	DQ8	N
0303		1	1	2563

The serotyping efficiency of DQ3 recognition relative to DQ2, DQ7, DQ8, and DQ9 is shown to the left. Compared to DQ2 serotyping of DQB1*0201 positive individuals (98%), the efficiency of DQ3 recognition is relatively low and error prone. This compares to genotyping efficiency of 100%. The recognition of DQB1*0303 by DQ9 and or DQ3 is poorest, DQ2 which recognizes a different DBB1*group recognizes DQB1*0303 as efficiently as DQ3.

For this reason DQ3 serotyping is a poor method of typing for transplantation or disease association prediction or study. Nonetheless, it is still widely used and association purported in the literature.

== Alleles ==
=== DQB1*0301 ===
DQB1*0301 the DQ7 gene, is detailed on HLA-DQ7

=== DQB1*0302 ===
DQB1*0302 the DQ8 gene, is detailed on HLA-DQ8

=== DQB1*0303 ===
DQB1*0303 the DQ9 gene, is detailed on HLA-DQ9

=== DQB1*0304 ===
DQB1*0304 is similar in structure and function to DQB1*0301 generally considered to be HLA-DQ7

=== DQB1*0305 ===
DQB1*0305 is similar in structure and function to DQB1*0302 generally considered to be HLA-DQ8
