= HLA-DR5 =

Broad-antigen serotype

Illustration of HLA-DR

HLA-DR5 (DR5) is a broad-antigen serotype that is further split into HLA-DR11 and HLA-DR12 antigen serotypes.

== Serology ==
DR11, DR5 and DR12 recognition of the gene products of some DRB1*11 and DRB1*12 alleles
| DRB1* | DR11 | DR5 | DR12 | Sample |
| allele | % | % | % | size (N) |
| 11:01 | 92 | 5 | | 3474 |
| 11:02 | 89 | 3 | | 430 |
| 11:03 | 89 | 4 | | 397 |
| 11:04 | 87 | 4 | | 2119 |
| 11:05 | 75 | | | 4 |
| 11:06 | 20 | 73 | | 15 |
| 11:07 | >50 | | | 1 |
| 11:08 | >50 | | | 2 |
| 11:09 | 80 | 20 | | 5 |
| | | | | . |
| | DR12 | DR5 | DR11 | Sample |
| 12:01 | 83 | 4 | 2 | 893 |
| 12:02 | 89 | | | 162 |
| 12:03 | >50 | | | 3 |
| 12:06 | >50 | | | 2 |

Except for a few DRB1* alleles, the reactivity of DR5 is relatively poor.

== Disease associations ==
DR5 is associated with persistent generalized lymphadenopathy and Kaposi's sarcoma in AIDS, juvenile rheumatoid arthritis, pernicious anemia, Hashimoto's thyroiditis, mycosis fungoides, polyglandular deficiency syndrome, systemic sclerosis, childhood epilepsy, early-onset alopecia areata, short-ragweed Ra6 allergy, primary antiphospholipid syndrome, and increased longevity in the Dutch.

== Genetic linkage ==
HLA-DR5 reactive gene products are linked to serology of HLA-DRB3 (HLA-DR52).
