= Human Genome Organisation =

Organization involved in the Human Genome Project

Human Genome Organization
- Abbreviation: HUGO
- Formation: 1989
- Type: INGO
- Region served: Worldwide
- Official language: English, French
- President: Ada Hamosh
- Website: hugo-international.org

The Human Genome Organisation (HUGO) is a non-profit organization founded in 1988. HUGO represents an international coordinating scientific body in response to initiatives such as the Human Genome Project. HUGO has four active committees, including the HUGO Gene Nomenclature Committee (HGNC), and the HUGO Committee on Ethics, Law and Society (CELS).

== History ==
HUGO was established at the first meeting on genome mapping and sequencing at Cold Spring Harbor in 1988. The idea of starting the organization stemmed from South African biologist Sydney Brenner, who is best known for his significant contributions to work on the genetic code and other areas of molecular biology, as well as winning the 2002 Nobel Prize in Physiology or Medicine.

A Founding Council was elected at the meeting with a total of 42 scientists from 17 different countries, with Victor A. McKusick serving as founding President. In 2016, HUGO was located at the EWHA Womans University in Seoul, South Korea. In 2020, the HUGO headquarters moved to Farmington, Connecticut, US.

HUGO has convened a Human Genome Meeting (HGM) every year since 1996.

In partnership with geneticist Yuan-Tsong Chen and Alice Der-Shan Chen, founders of the Chen Foundation, HUGO presents the Chen Award to those with research accomplishments in human genetics and genomics in Asia Pacific.

In 2020, HUGO merged with the Human Genomic Variation Society (HGVS) and Human Variome Project (HVP).

=== Presidents ===
- Piero Carninci (Italy) – 2025 to present
- Ada Hamosh (US) – 2023 to 2025
- Charles Lee (South Korea, US) – 2017 to 2023
- Stylianos Antonarakis (Switzerland) – 2012 to 2017
- Edison Liu (Singapore) – 2007 to 2012
- Leena Peltonen (Finland) – 2005 to 2007
- Yoshiyuki Sakaki (Japan) – 2002 to 2005
- Lap-Chee Tsui (Canada) – 2000 to 2002
- Gert‐Jan van Ommen (Netherlands) – 1998 to 1999
- Grant Sutherland (Australia) – 1996 to 1997
- Thomas Caskey (US) – 1993 to 1995
- Walter Bodmer (UK) – 1991 to 1993
- Victor McKusick (US), Founding President – 1988 to 1991

== HUGO Committee on Ethics, Law and Society ==
HUGO's Committee on Ethics, Law and Society (CELS) is an interdisciplinary academic working group that is a uniquely positioned to analyse bioethical matters in genomics at a conceptual level and with an international perspective. To this end, CELS mission is to explore and inform professional discourse on the ethical aspects of genetics and genomics, normally though scholarly engagement, thought-provoking papers, and policy guiding statements.

The first meeting of the HUGO Ethics Committee took place in Amsterdam in October 1992, chaired by Nancy Wexler (Columbia University). In 2010, under the leadership of then HUGO president Edison Liu (The Jackson Laboratory) and a new chair Ruth Chadwick (Cardiff University), the committee became the HUGO Committee on Ethics, Law and Society (CELS). Benjamin Capps was nominated to be the present chair at the HUGO Human Genome Meeting, held in Barcelona in 2017.

=== Chairs ===
2017–present: Benjamin Capps (UK, Canada)

2010–2017: Ruth Chadwick (UK)

1996–2008: Bartha Knoppers (Canada)

1992–1996: Nancy Wexler (US)

=== Statements & Opinions ===
The Ecological Genome Project and the Promises of Ecogenomics for Society: Realising a Shared Vision as One Health (Bioethics, 39: 788-795), 2025

The Human Genome Organisation (HUGO) and a vision for Ecogenomics: The Ecological Genome Project (Human Genomics 17: 115), 2023

The Human Genome Organisation (HUGO) and the 2020 COVID-19 pandemic (Human Genomics 15:12), 2021

Statement on Bioinformatics and Capturing the Benefits of Genome Sequencing for Society (Human Genomics 13, 24), 2019

Falling giants and the rise of gene editing: ethics, private interests and the public good (Human Genomics 11, 20), 2017

Ethical issues of CRISPR technology and gene editing through the lens of solidarity (British Medical Bulletin 122(1): 17-29), 2017

Imagined Futures: Capturing the Benefits of Genome Sequencing for Society (Technical Report) 2013

Statement on Supreme Court: Genes are not Patentable, June 2013

Statement on Pharmacogenomics (PGx): Solidarity, Equity and Governance (Life Sciences, Society and Policy 3, 44), April 2007

Statement on Stem Cells (Eubios Ethics Institute), November 2004

Statement on the scope of gene patents, research exemption, and licensing of patented gene sequences for diagnostics (Journal international de bioéthique et d'éthique des sciences, Sep-Dec;14(3-4): 201-5), 2003

Statement on Human Genomic Databases (Eubios Journal of Asian and International Bioethics 13: 99), December 2003

Statement in Gene Therapy Research (Eubios Journal of Asian and International Bioethics 11: 98-99), April 2001

Statement on Benefit Sharing (Clinical Genetics 58(5): 364-6), April 2000

Statement on Cloning (Eubios Journal of Asian and International Bioethics 9: 70), March 1999

Statement on DNA Sampling: Control and Access (Eubios Journal of Asian and International Bioethics 8: 56-57), February 1998

Statement on the Principled Conduct of Genetics Research, March 1996

== See also ==
- HUGO Gene Nomenclature Committee
- Victor A. McKusick
- Ira Carmen
- List of genetics research organizations
- International Mammalian Genome Society
