= European Bioinformatics Institute =

Centre for research

European Bioinformatics Institute (EBI)

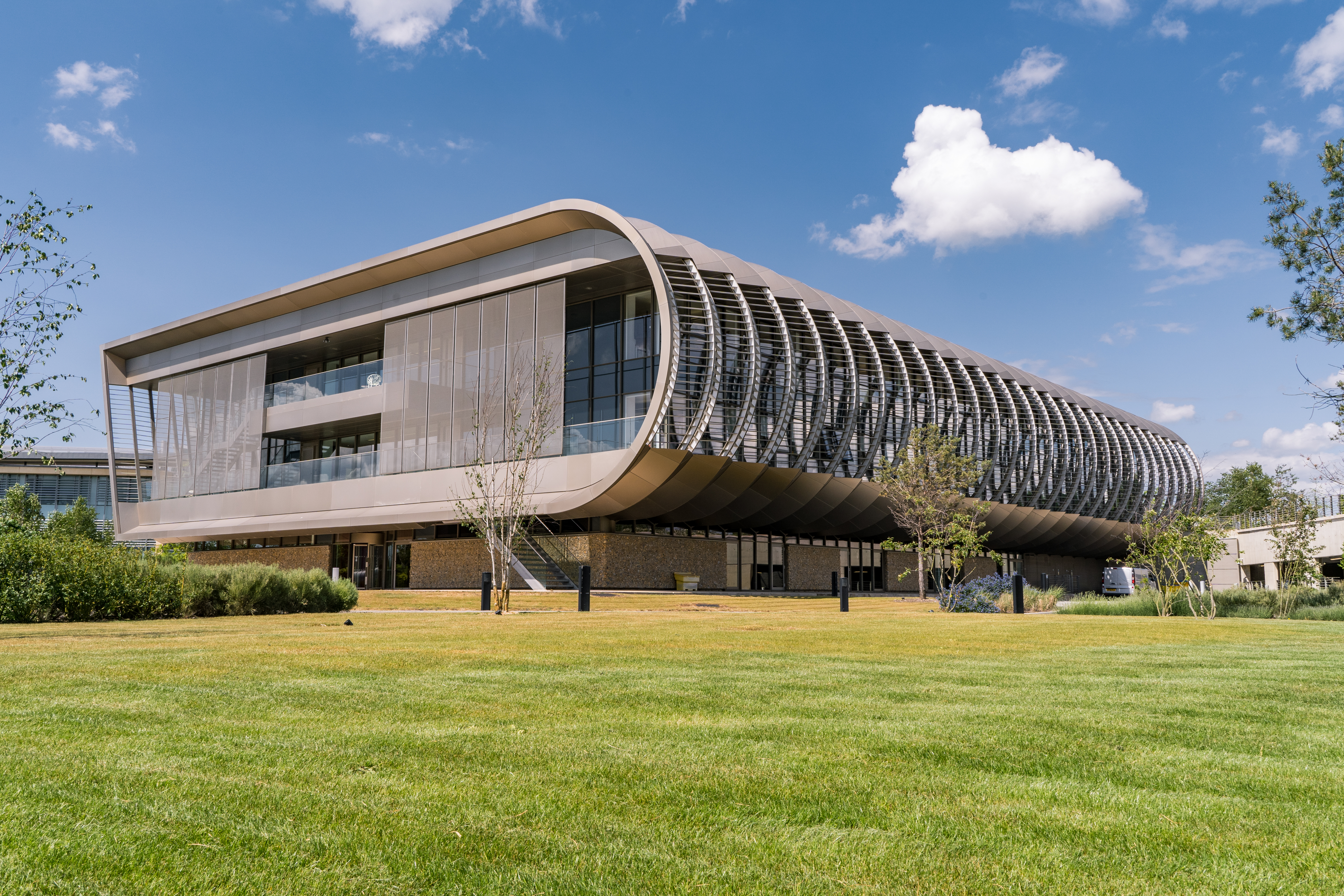
- EMBL-EBI South Building
- Abbreviation: EMBL-EBI
- Formation: 1994
- Location: Wellcome Genome Campus, Hinxton, Cambridgeshire, UK
- Coordinates: 52°04′48″N 0°11′11″E
- Director: Ewan Birney
- Associate Director: Rolf Apweiler
- Parent organization: European Molecular Biology Laboratory
- Staff: 685
- Website: www.ebi.ac.uk

The European Bioinformatics Institute (EMBL-EBI) is an intergovernmental organization (IGO) which, as part of the European Molecular Biology Laboratory (EMBL) family, focuses on research and services in bioinformatics. It is located on the Wellcome Genome Campus in Hinxton near Cambridge, and employs over 600 full-time equivalent (FTE) staff.

Further, the EMBL-EBI hosts training programs that teach scientists the fundamentals of the work with biological data and promote the plethora of bioinformatic tools available for their research, both EMBL-EBI-based and not so.

== Bioinformatic services ==
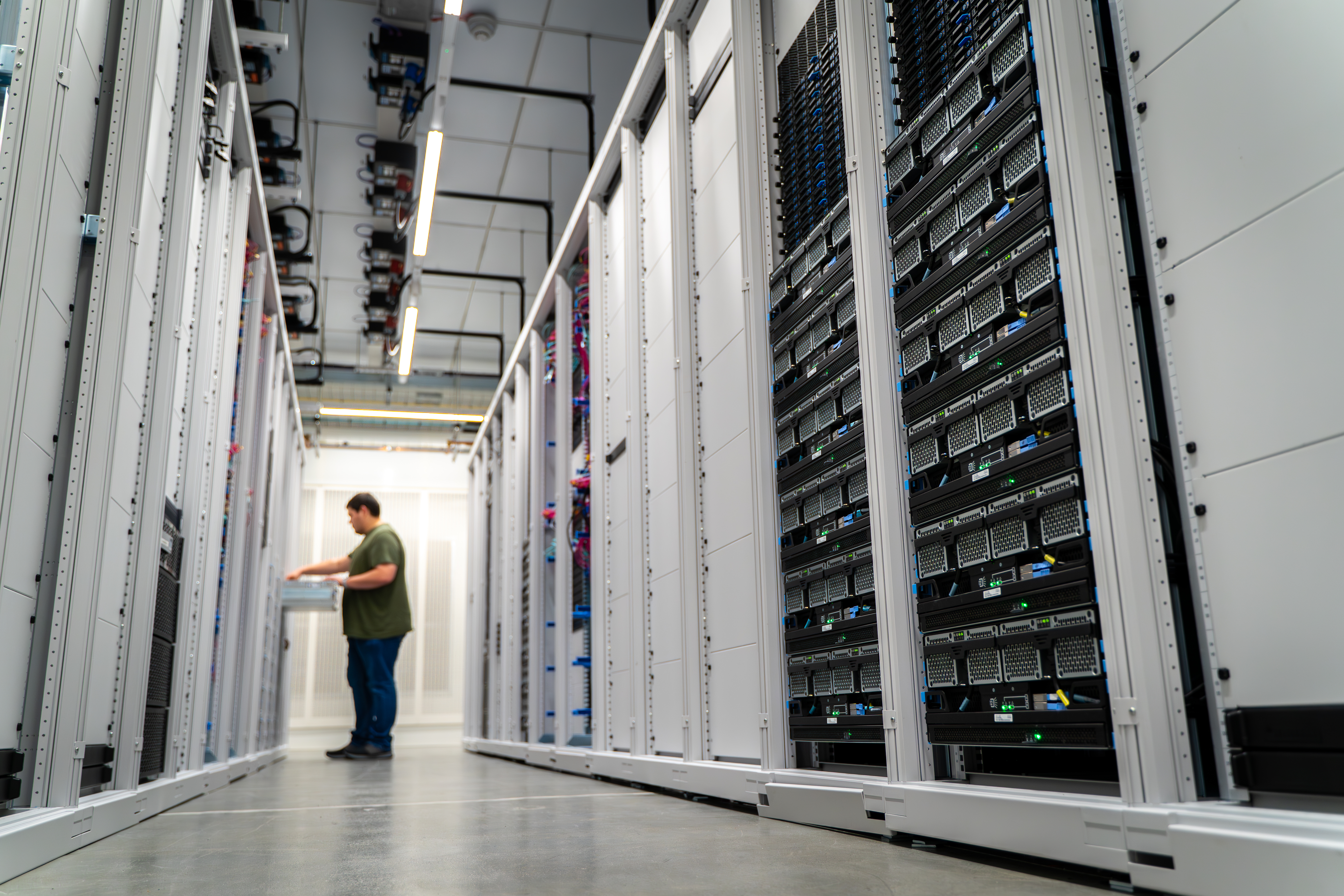
EMBL-EBI Data Centre

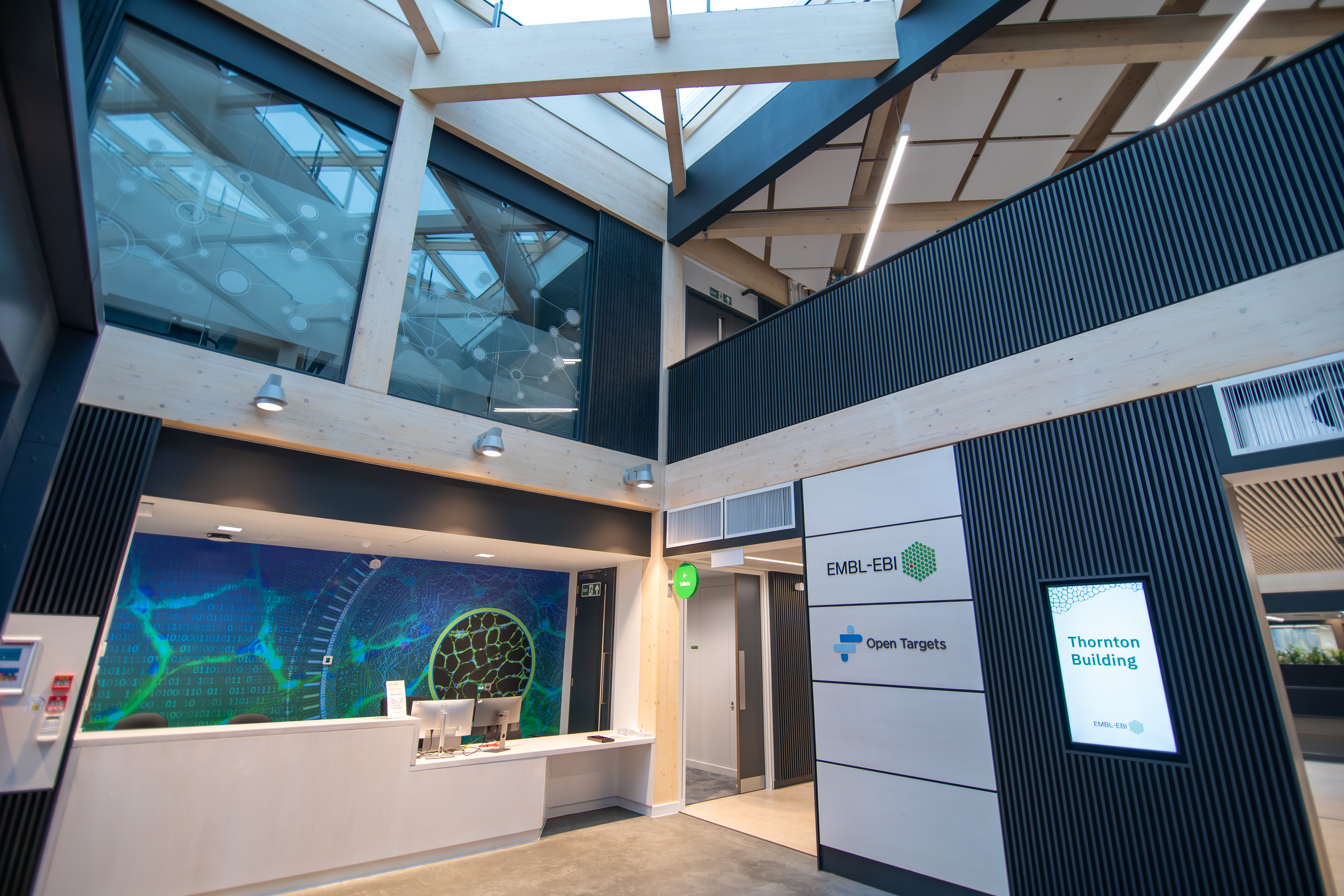
EMBL-EBI Thornton Building reception area

One of the roles of the EMBL-EBI is to index and maintain biological data in a set of databases, including Ensembl (housing whole genome sequence data), UniProt (protein sequence and annotation database) and Protein Data Bank (protein and nucleic acid tertiary structure database). A variety of online services and tools is provided, such as Basic Local Alignment Search Tool (BLAST) or Clustal Omega sequence alignment tool, enabling further data analysis.

=== BLAST ===
BLAST is an algorithm for comparing biomacromolecule primary structure, most often nucleotide sequence of DNA/RN, and amino acid sequence of proteins, stored in the bioinformatic databases, with the query sequence. The algorithm uses scoring of the available sequences against the query by a scoring matrix such as BLOSUM 62. The highest scoring sequences represent the closest relatives of the query, in terms of functional and evolutionary similarity.

The database search by BLAST requires input data to be in a correct format (e.g. FASTA, GenBank, PIR or EMBL format). Users may also designate the specific databases to be searched, select scoring matrices to be used and other parameters prior to the tool run. The best hits in the BLAST results are ordered according to their calculated E-value (the probability of the presence of a similarly or higher-scoring hit in the database by chance).

=== Clustal Omega ===
Clustal Omega is a multiple sequence alignment (MSA) tool that enables to find an optimal alignment of at least three and maximum of 4000 input DNA and protein sequences. Clustal Omega algorithm employs two profile Hidden Markov models (HMMs) to derive the final alignment of the sequences. The output of the Clustal Omega may be visualized in a guide tree (the phylogenetic relationship of the best-pairing sequences) or ordered by the mutual sequence similarity between the queries. The main advantage of Clustal Omega over other MSA tools (Muscle, ProbCons) is its efficiency, while maintaining a significant accuracy of the results.

=== Ensembl ===
Based at the EMBL-EBI, the Ensembl is a database organized around genomic data, maintained by the Ensembl Project. Tasked with the continuous annotation of the genomes of model organisms, Ensembl provides researchers a comprehensive resource of relevant biological information about each specific genome. The annotation of the stored reference genomes is automatic and sequence-based. Ensembl encompasses a publicly available genome database which can be accessed via a web browser. The stored data can be interacted with using a graphical UI, which supports the display of data in multiple resolution levels from karyotype, through individual genes, to nucleotide sequence.

Originally centered on vertebrate animals as its main field of interest, since 2009 Ensembl provides annotated data regarding the genomes of plants, fungi, invertebrates, bacteria and other species, in the sister project Ensembl Genomes. As of 2020, the various Ensembl project databases together house over 50,000 reference genomes.

=== PDB ===
Protein Data Bank (PDB) is a database of three dimensional structures of biological macromolecules, such as proteins and nucleic acids. The data are typically obtained by X-ray crystallography or nuclear magnetic resonance spectroscopy (NMR spectroscopy), and submitted manually by structural biologists worldwide through PDB member organizations – PDBe, RCSB, PDBj and BMRB. The database can be accessed through the webpages of its members, including PDBe (housed at the EMBL-EBI). As a member of the Worldwide Protein Data Bank (wwPDB) consortium, PDBe aids in the joint mission of archiving and maintenance of macromolecular structure data.

=== UniProt ===
UniProt is an online repository of protein sequence and annotation data, distributed in UniProt Knowledgebase (UniProt KB), UniProt Reference Clusters (UniRef) and UniProt Archive (UniParc) databases. Originally conceived as the individual ventures of EMBL-EBI, Swiss Institute of Bioinformatics (SIB) (together maintaining Swiss-Prot and TrEMBL) and Protein Information Resource (PIR) (housing Protein Sequence Database), the increase in the global protein data generation led to their collaboration in the creation of UniProt in 2002.

The protein entries stored in UniProt are cataloged by a unique UniProt identifier. The annotation data collected for the each entry are organized in logical sections (e.g. protein function, structure, expression, sequence or relevant publications), allowing a coordinated overview about the protein of interest. Links to external databases and original sources of data are also provided. In addition to standard search by the protein name/identifier, UniProt webpage houses tools for BLAST searching, sequence alignment or searching for proteins containing specific peptides.

=== AlphaFold DB ===
The AlphaFold Protein Structure Database (AlphaFold DB) is a collaborative project with Google DeepMind to make predicted protein structures from the AlphaFold AI system freely available to the scientific community. The first release of the database was in 2021; as of 2024, AlphaFold DB provides access to over 214 million protein structures.

== Other bioinformatics organisations ==
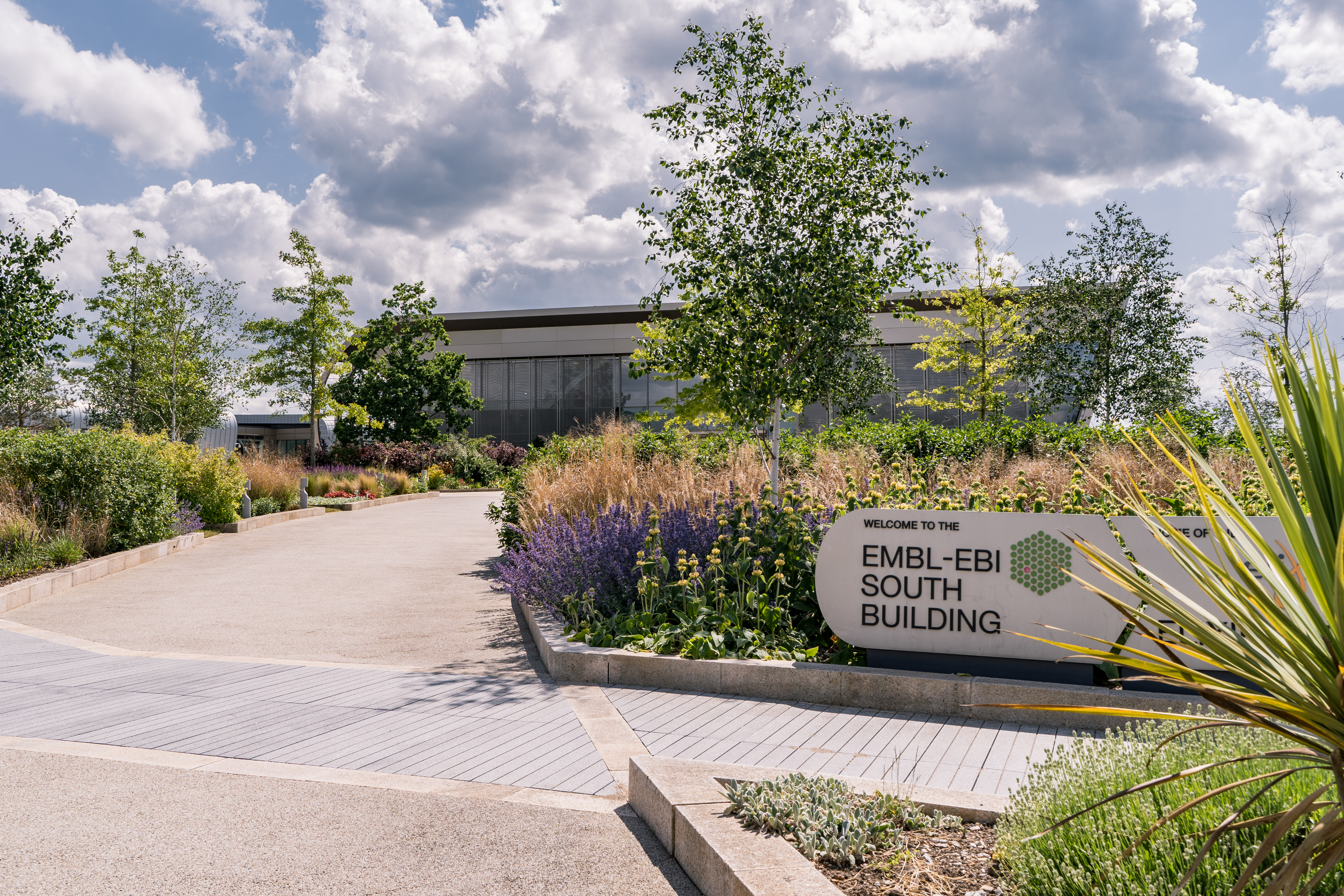
EMBL's European Bioinformatics Institute, Hinxton, Cambridge, UK

- National Center for Biotechnology Information (NCBI), United States National Library of Medicine
- National Institute of Genetics (DNA Data Bank of Japan)
- Swiss Institute of Bioinformatics (SIB: Expasy)
- Australia Bioinformatics Resource
- BIG Data Center (National Genomics Data Center), Beijing Institute of Genomics, Chinese Academy of Sciences

== See also ==
- Alternative splicing and transcript diversity database
- BioJS - open-source project for bioinformatics data on the web
- BioSamples
- European Molecular Biology Organization
- European Nucleotide Archive
