= HLA B7-DR15-DQ6 =

HLA A3-B7-DR15-DQ6
- HLA region on chromosome 6

Loci
| Loci | Gene | Allele | Serotype |
|---|---|---|---|
| Class I centromeric | HLA-C | *0702 | Cw7 |
| Class I centromeric | HLA-B | *0702 | B7 |
| HLA-DR | HLA-DRB1 | *1501 | DR15 |
| HLA-DRB5 | *0101 | DR51 |
| HLA-DQ | HLA-DQA1 | *0102 | DQ1 |
| HLA-DQB1 | *0602 | DQ6 |

Nodes
- Population_{Maxima}: Western Ireland
- Freq._{Max}: 6.0%

Size and location
- Chromosome: 6
- Location: 6p21.3
- Size (kbps): 2500

HLA B7-DR15-DQ6 is a multigene haplotype that covers a majority of the human major histocompatibility complex on chromosome 6. A multigene haplotype is set of inherited alleles covering several genes, or gene-alleles, common multigene haplotypes are generally the result of descent by common ancestry (share a recent common ancestor for that segment of the chromosome). Chromosomal recombination fragments multigene haplotypes as the distance to that ancestor increases in number of generations.

HLA B7-DR15-DQ6 is a representation(by serotype) of a common HLA haplotype found in Western Eurasia. The haplotype can be written in an extended form covering the major histocompatibility loci as follows:

HLA Cw*0702 : B*0702 : DRB1*1501 : DQA1*0102 : DQB1*0602

The older literature may describe this haplotype in two different ways. One B7-DR2-DQ6 derives from the fact that DR15 is a split antigen of the DR2 broad antigen serotype. The other B7-DR2-DQ1 stems from the fact that DQ1 is an alpha chain serotype that is now covered by the beta chain type DQ5 and DQ6 (DQ1 pairs with DQ5 and DQ6 by cis-haplotype pairing).

There are two major subhaplotypes one that is preceded on its telomeric side by HLA A*0301 and the other by HLA A*0201. The A*0301 bearing haplotype (HLA A3-B7-DR15-DQ6) is described as the longest known multigene haplotype in humans.

== HLA A2-B7-DR15-DQ6 ==
The appendation of the B7::DQ6 haplotype creates the A2-B7::DQ6 haplotype. This haplotype if found often in Northern Spain, Switzerland, Netherlands.

HLA A*0201Cw*0702 : B*0702 : DRB1*1501 : DQA1*0102 : DQB1*0602

== HLA A3-B7-DR15-DQ6 ==
HLA A3-B7 haplotype frequencies
freq | Rank in
ref. | Population | (%) | Pop.
Swiss | 9.1 | ^{1}
Ireland | 8.6
Austria | 7.4 | ^{1}
Northern Ireland | 6.5 | ^{1}
Netherlands | 6.6
Belgium | 6.0 | ^{1}
Swedish | 5.7 | 3
German | 5.7
Polish | 4.9
Romanian | 3.8
Armenia | 3.7
Portuguese | 3.4
British | 3.4
Czech | 3.1
Svans | 2.7
Albania | 2.7
Tuscan Italy | 2.7
Spanish | 2.6
Basque | 2.5
Italy | 1.6
Greek | 1.3
Bulgaria | 1.1
^{1} Cw*0702 (Europe)

The gene-allele representation of the haplotype is:

HLA A*0301Cw*0702 : B*0702 : DRB1*1501 : DQA1*0102 : DQB1*0602

This is considered now the longest of the widely distributed ancestral haplotypes, its length is 4.8 million nucleotides and extends from TRIM27 gene . . . .The haplotype is nodal in Ireland but is also at high frequency in Switzerland, it has a subnode in the Pasiegos of northern Spain. There is some variance in the distribution of A3::DQ6 relative to A1::DQ2 in that there is more of a bias toward central and eastern Europe. Parts of the haplotype are spread into East Asia and even appear within the New world's indigenous populations. DR15:DQ6 frequencies peak in central Asia, and it is suspect that this may be a point of Eurasian spread westward into Europe.

While there are some diseases associated with the haplotype, the frequency of association is less compared to A1::B8.

== Disease Associations ==
HLA B7-DR15-DQ6 was found to have an association with postmenopausal osteoporosis in a Greek population.

DR2 (15 or 16) -DQ6.2 has been found to associate with (idiopathic) narcolepsy-cataplexy Hypocretin ligand deficiency in the brain and cerebrospinal fluid is also link to narcolepsy-cataplexy. DR15-DQ6 also shows an association with factors (including a genetic factor on chromosome 12p12) involved in familial multiple sclerosis DR15-DQ6 is strongly associated with the development of choroidal neovascular lesions in presumed ocular histoplasmosis syndrome.

The DR15-DQ6 haplotype may afford some greater protection against the progression of HIV. However, the haplotype is a risk factor in cervical cancer.
