= A30-Cw5-B18-DR3-DQ2 (HLA Haplotype) =

Multigene haplotype

HLA A30-Cw5-B18-DR3-DQ2
- HLA region on chromosome 6

Loci
Loci	Gene	Allele	Serotype
Class I	HLA-A	*3002	A30
Class I	HLA-C	*0501	Cw5
Class I	HLA-B	*1801	B18
HLA-DR	HLA-DRB1	*0301	DR3
HLA-DRB3	*0202	DR52
HLA-DQ	HLA-DQA1	*0501
HLA-DQB1	*0201	DQ2

Nodes
- Population_{Maxima}: Sardinia, Italy
- Freq._{Max}: 15.0%

Size and location
- Chromosome: 6
- Location: 6p21.3

Associated diseases
Haplotype (gene)	Disease(s)
DQ2.5	Coeliac disease
DR3-DQ2	Juvenile diabetes, Sarcoidosis
B8::DQ2	Autoimmune hepatitis, Primary biliary cirrhosis, Myasthenia gravis, Dermatitis herpetiformis

HLA A30-Cw5-B18-DR3-DQ2 (A30::DQ2) is a multigene haplotype that extends across a majority of the major histocompatibility complex on human chromosome 6. A multigene haplotype is a set of inherited alleles covering several genes, or gene-alleles. Long haplotypes, like A30::DQ2, are generally the result of descent by common ancestry. As haplotypes increase in size, Chromosomal recombination fragments them in a generation dependent process.

A30::DQ2 can be written in an extended form covering the major histocompatibility loci as follows:

HLA A*3002 : Cw*0501 : B*1801 : DRB1*0301 : DQA1*0501 : DQB1*0201.

There are several composite haplotypes, A30-Cw5-B18 and a variant A30-CBL-B18 comprise A30::B18, there is also the B18-DR3 component and the HLA DR3-DQ2.5. Other haplotypes such as Cw5-B16-DR3 or B8-DR3-DQ2.5 have been presented in the literature.

A dozen inflammatory diseases of the immune system can attribute some risk to the haplotype. Some diseases like coeliac disease primarily associate with certain genes. While other diseases, like type 1 diabetes may have several, highly different, genes that attribute risk. Still other diseases, like myasthenia gravis have undetermined linkage to the haplotype.

Haplotypes of A30-B18 or Cw5-B18 have been studied (see allelefrequencies.net and IHWC 1991). Despite that large areas of Northern Africa have not been studies by HLA, A30::DQ2 appears to have originate southwest of is current mode in Sardinia. Gómez-Casado et al. (2000) observed that the haplotype is of likely paleo North African origin, and later studies of North Africa support that finding. Northern Iberians share with Sardinians a high frequency of the haplotype. However, there are some differences, linkage disequilibrium in Sardinians is highest whereas the Basque haplotype frequently has a different Cw allele indicating different origin for the haplotype.

== Distribution ==
Types and frequencies of A30-Cw5-B18
	A	Cw	B	DR	DQ
S	30	5	18	3	2	Freq.
G	*3002	*0501	*1801	*0301	*0201	%
s			Sardinian			17.3
s			Basque			15.2
g			Morocco Arabic			3.2
g			N . Morocco Berber			2.9
s			Swiss			2.9
s			Spanish			2.7
s			N. African Negroid			2.3
s			Italian			2.0
s			Albanian			1.8
s			French			1.7
g			Tunisian Tunis			1.2
s			Dutch			0.8
s			German			0.6
s			Irish			0.6
s	Sardinian				~~Cw~~	14.0
s	Basque				~~Cw~~	7.5
g	Portugal South				~~Cw~~	4.1
g	Azores (part)				~~Cw~~	2.6
g	Cape Verde SE Isles				~~Cw~~	2.4
g	Cape Verde NW Isles				~~Cw~~	1.6
s	Italian				~~Cw~~	0.4
g		Spain Murcia				3.5
g	Morocco Arabic ~~Cw~~					1.5
s	Sardinia					15.1
g		Portugal South				8.2
g		Portugal Center				2.0
g		Ireland South				1.0
g	Tunisia					2.0
s=serotype, g=genotype
Blocked out columns are not a part of haplotypes, however: If block denotes A-B then Cw is missing If block Denoted A-B-DR then Cw is missing

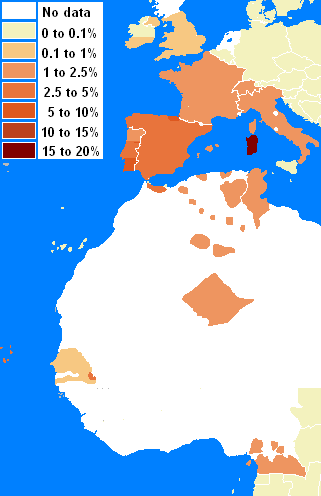
Distribution of Cw5-B18 (including A30-Cw5-B18, Cw5-B18-DR haplotypes not listed as Cw5-B18) in the Afro-European region

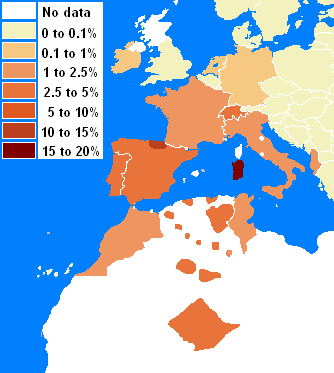
Distribution of B18-DR3 (including Cw5-B18-DR and B18-DR3-DQ2 haplotypes not listed as Cw5-B18) in the Afro-European region

The full haplotype has a fairly contained distribution, from Sardinia to Northern Spain, to Southern Spain, Morocco, and Tunisia. Trace amounts of A30-B18-DR3 can be found in Germany, Italy. However, in the case of the Germans the Cw allele was not typed so it is undetermined whether the haplotype is of the 'Basque' variant or the ancestral 'Sardinian' type, In addition in Sardinia the A30 serotype has never been resolved by high resolution genetyping and therefore the A*3002 has not been confirmed.

Cw5-B18
The Cw5-B18 (Cw*0501:B*1801) appears to be the oldest portion of the haplotype, as it is found below the sahel in the rainforest dwelling peoples of Cameroon and it is also found in the Nikoholo Mandenka. The second is not enlightening on its origin since there appears to be more recent geneflow between the Mandenka and the Tuareg Berbers. Studies of Rimaibe, Fulbe of Burkino Faso did not reveal the haplotype and many areas of West Africa have not been studied for CwB haplotypes. The CwB haplotype peaks in Sardinia along with the rest of the haplotype and can be found in high resolution studies of the S. Irish, N. Irish, UK Caucasoids, and French. Many older studies did not have the resolution to detect the haplotype below a frequency of 1 percent, but a variety of evidence suggests that it declines to the northeast to trace levels.(See Table-below and Map-right)

B18-DR3
The B-DR component shows a similar distribution, but lacks adequate testing to the south to resolve its most southern extent. DR3-DQ2 is very common in West and North Africa. And B18 is also elevated in N. Africa and Middle East, with peak levels in Italy. However B18 found in the Middle East is linked to B18-DR11 (DR11 is very common in the Eastern Mediterranean). The level of B18-DR3 peaks in Sardinia but is also very high in the Basque region of Northern Spain. This is one area of Europe where the B18-DR3 level is relatively different from Cw5-B18, as it appears there was a rare recombination event in the evolution of Cw5-B18-DR3 that lead to the replacement of Cw*0501 with Cw*1201. This might have occurred in northwest Iberia. Sardinia lacks this recombinant. Levels of B18-DR3 in Europe appear to be combinations of the Cw*0501 and Cw*1201 haplotype. For instance, Albania has significant levels of B18-DR3 but lacks Cw5-B18 in significant quantities. In the Dutch and German populations B-DR haplotypes have undergone more intense studies allowing the detection of haplotypes to very low frequencies (0.25% in the Dutch and 0.05% in the Germans) consequently the edge of B18-DR3 haplotype in Europe is evident. Areas where typing lacks resolution are Austria, Slovakia, Czech republic, etc. The levels detectable in these regions may be higher, similar to levels detected in Switzerland during early studies.(See Table-left and Map-left)

DR3-DQ2
The DR3-DQ2 component is not uncommon in Europe and is shared by the northwest-European ancestral haplotype AH8.1. Furthermore, the DR3-DQ2 component appears within certain European groups with the Afro-Central Asia haplotype A33-B58.

A30-B18
Areas in which CwB is low or untyped may contain A30-B18. For example, an early study of the Swiss indicated a haplotype frequency level of 1 percent. A30-B18 has been detected in a number of studies in Africa, however in East Africa the Cw allele *0501 (Cw5) is replaced by Cw7 in Kenya and Cw2 in the Sudanese. A30-B18 is found from Senegal to Morocco reaching France. A recent study of French departments found that A30-B18 is found in every department in France, indicating it has a more ancient distribution in the region. It is also found in Germans below 1 percent. Because the haplotype is indifferent to Cw allele the level is high in the Basque of Northern Spain. A30-B18 frequencies at trace levels may not indicate a common origin with A30::DQ2, Two alleles are found of A30 in Europe, A*3001 and A*3002, neither are common, but A*3002 is more common in Western Europe (attributed to the A30::DQ2 haplotype) A*3001 is common in India and to the East, and B18 is high in Italy, therefore random recombination will produce A30-B18 however, this may be of the haplotype A*3001-B18-DR11 haplotype.

== Origin ==
Types and frequencies of A30-Cw5-B18
	A	Cw	B	DR	DQ
S	30	5	18	3	2	Freq.
G	*3002	*0501	*1801	*0301	*0201	%
s	Sardinia			~~Cw~~		17.0
s	Basque			~~Cw~~		8.1
g	Azores (part.)			~~Cw~~		3.6
g	Tunisia			~~Cw~~		3.0
s	Spanish			~~Cw~~		2.8
g	Morocco Arabic			~~Cw~~		2.6
g	N. Morocco Berber			~~Cw~~		2.2
g	Kenya Luo			~~Cw~~		1.9
s	Sudan			~~Cw~~		1.8
s	Swiss			~~Cw~~		1.5
g	Portugal North			~~Cw~~		1.1
s	Italian			~~Cw~~		0.4
s	German			~~Cw~~		0.16
s		Sardinian				20.0
s		Basque				5.7
s		Sp. Gypsy				3.9
s		Spanish				3.6
g		N. Morocco Berber				3.2
s		N. Afr. Negroid				3.4
s		Senegal				3.0
g		Nikoholo Mandenka				2.8
s		French				1.3
s		Italian				1.1
g		Bioko Bubi				1.0
g		Cameroon, Rainforest				1.1
g		UK Caucasoid				1.1
g		N. Irish				0.9
s		N. American Negroid				0.6
s	Sardinian					16.4
g	Italy Sardinia pop3					12.5
g	Sp. Basque Gipuzkoa					6.1
g	Azores (part.)					3.6
s	Basque					3.2
s	Spanish					2.7
s	Senegal					2.5
g	Sp. Balaeirc Isles					2.2
g	France Corsica					2.0
s	Sp. Gypsy					2.0
g	Sp. Catalonia Girona					1.7
s	Italian					0.6
s=serotype, g=genotype
Blocked out columns are not a part of haplotypes, however: If block denotes A-B then Cw is missing If block Denoted A-B-DR then Cw is missing

Archaeological evidence suggests that Sardinia was settled about 8000 years ago, although human occupation has been noted at least 20,000 years ago. During the Neolithic period, black obsidian drew other Mediterraneans to the Island. The local contributions (Italian peninsula via Corsica, Balearic Islands) and Eastern Mediterranean genetic influences have been single out as founding populations on the Island. HLA class II typing (HLA-DRB1, DQA1, and DQB1) of Sardinians revealed that they fell outside of the European cluster and tended to fall in the Greek and Bulgarian cluster. Prior to this study Class I loci (See HLA) were typed as part of a global typing workshop held in 1991; In addition, 551 families were typed deriving 2202 HLA A,B, Cw Haplotypes in 1992 At the time A30-B18 had been noted in Algerian Berbers, and in the South of France. Subsequently, studies by Antonio Arniaz-Villena and 4 other groups on HLA Class I loci revealed that allele frequency patterns of the Northwestern Mediterranean clustered together and with peoples of North Africa and the Middle East. In light of the HLA distinctions of Sardinians and common belief that the Island was inhabited from the north, A30-B18-DR3, the most frequent haplotype, did not reconcile with many opinions on Sardinian origins.

=== haplotypes unique properties ===
A30::DQ2 is unique in Europe for several reasons. The 1992 study found 6 haplotypes with very high linkage disequilibrium values for the Sardinian population with A30::DQ2 being the highest frequency of these 6 haplotypes. Moreover, A30-cw5-B18 has the highest maximum frequency for any haplotype in any people in Europe, at 15 percent, it exceeds the AH8.1 haplotype in Ireland by 4 percent. (However, class II typing in Western Ireland indicated AH8.1 might go as high as 15%). The haplotype and its sub-components are also in linkage disequilibrium in Iberia (particularly northern Iberia), Morocco.

When high-resolution typing of A*3002 is used the disequilibrium increases. Unlike AH8.1, many components of the A30::DQ2 are not common among most European peoples. Excepting A*3002:Cw*0501:B*1801 haplotype, A*3002, the A30 allele found in the A30-Cw5-B18 haplotype, is rare in Europe. (Note: The HLA-A30 allele group in Sardinians has not undergone high-resolution typing to date, it is inferred as A*3002 given the match between 4 other components of the haplotype. Two early studies examined HLA serotypes, this was followed by a comparative study between Corsicans, Balearians and Sardinians which did high-resolution typing of some allele groups, but not others, and A*30 was evaluated by low resolution typing. Consequently the informative core regions of the haplotype are Cw5/Cw*0501-B18/B*1801) Excluding this A30-cw5-B18 the A*3002 allele is most frequent in sub-Saharan Africa. The frequency of this allele is highest in Zambia's Lusaka (23.3%) and Zimbabwe Harare Shona (14.7%) but is also high in Senegal, Cameroon, Moroccan Berbers, Kenya and indigenous South Africans. Outside of regions where A30-B18 are found in Europe, the frequency of A*3002 is low to absent. B*1801 is highest in northern Italy but high frequencies are found from North Africa to the Middle East and well into sub-Saharan Africa. In addition the conserved Cw5-B18 core of the haplotype is not common among other Europeans or Eastern Mediterraneans which instead have Cw7-B18 and the Cw*12-B18 haplotypes. And while A*3002-B*1801 exists in Kenya (Cw*0701) is not the Cw5/Cw*0501 found in the Western Mediterranean, A30-Cw2-B18 was also found in peoples of mixed Arab-Negroid ancestry in Sudan; however the study Cw5 variant was not found. This indicates that A30-B18 haplotypes can spontaneously form, however the A30-Cw5-B18-DR3-DQ2 haplotype exists primarily among the indigenous populations of the Western Mediterranean and super-Equatorial West Africa.

The examination of the core conserved region of the haplotype Cw5-B18 indicates that it likely originated in Africa. The DR3-DQ2 component is found at high frequencies in the Irish, but in strong linkage disequilibrium in the AH8.1 haplotype. Recent studies indicate that DR3-DQ2 in two branches of AH8.1 have a common origin in Africa at about 75,000 years ago; the frequency maximum of the haplotype is in the Côte d'Ivoire region and northwest portion of Central Africa. Taken together, A30-Cw5-B18-DR3-DQ2's origin among peoples with deep Eurasian ancestry is highly unlikely, and indicates that this haplotypes abundance in Sardinia is a likely consequence of a founder effect or positive selection and other genetic factors. There is a claimed shared ancestry between Sardinians and the Basque, however Sardinia is proximal to North Africa, and does not bear the Cw variant found in the Basque or Morocco, whereas the Basque most likely can attribute their variant A30::DQ2 to gene flow from northwest Morocco.

=== Conflicting origins ===
A30-B18 origin's do not fit well into a some contrasting neighbor-joining analysis (Trees). Trees that place Sardinians together with Eastern Mediterranean peoples have difficulty explaining the origin of the haplotype. In Israel the level of A*3002 is less than one percent and in Asia the allele is detected in some parts of South Asia and may be associated with other recent migrations from Africa. Within the Aegean/Ionian region only Macedonia shows an appreciable level of A*3002, and Albania shows levels of B18-DR3 indicating gene flow from the West from the Italian peninsula to the eastern Ionian coast. While haplotypes have a higher threshold of detection, Cw5-B18 has not been detected in any Eastern Mediterranean people; the B18-DR3 is also rare to Sardinia's East except in the Italians, Swiss and Albanians (1.8%); and DR3-DQ2 is generally lowest in Europe in the Northeastern Mediterranean. Consequently, if the haplotype did have a recent common origin in or with the Aegean or Black Sea peoples it would need to have expanded from extremely low frequencies after entry in Sardinia. Studies of Aegean populations over the last decade have revealed the presence of alleles rare in Eurasia and common in sub-Saharan Africans(See map on page for peoples not effectively surveyed for HLA in North Africa). While there are some similarities these rare alleles often have a punctuated distribution along the coastal regions extended from Anatolia to the Black Sea through the Aegean and Ionian regions. This pattern continues in the Western Mediterranean includes the Atlantic coast of Europe (Basque, Pasiegos valley). Because of the differences these rare allele frequencies, however as one moves westward these African affinity with Subsaharan Africa (Note: See map, many areas of North Africa, and particularly Northeast Africa are poorly analyzed by HLA sero- or geno- typing) decreases and the affinity with northwest Africa increases. The common ingredient these studies have are shorter distance in a local cluster to 'non-Caucasian' HLA sources in the most adjacent regions of Africa in which relevant HLA typing has been completed.

There are other haplotypes that have similar origins (e.g. A2-Cw7-B58-DR16-DQ5.2) and combined these haplotypes represent approximately 30 percent of Sardinians haplotypes by gene frequency, indicating the potential of a significant and early African contribution to Sardinia. Despite the assumed connections between Sardinians and Western Europe these haplotypes have spread poorly into Europe, with levels in Germany at 0.16 percent for A30-B18-DR3, 2 magnitudes lower than in Sardinia. This contrasts with AH8.1 an ancestral haplotype for Western Europe which has a mode within Ireland, but the haplotype is found at high levels in Scandinavians, Basque, Swiss, Hungarians, Ukrainians, Slovenians, etc. The argument of selection could be used to explain these differences, however both haplotypes contain the DR3-DQ2 disease-associated haplotype.

=== Sources of error ===
The early studies of archaeology and genetics Sardinia may have been plagued by incorrect assumptions. For example, the archaeological ties with Europe may have been overemphasized given the poor archaeological studies of North Africa. Recent archaeological studies in Africa reveal the advancement of pottery traditions and animal husbandry in the Sahel prior to or contemporary with the onset of Southwest Asia's Neolithic period. In addition, if African contributions to Sardinia were largely a consequence of small numbers of founders prior to the Holocene, given rise in sea levels and low population densities, archaeological observations may not represent early occupation or cultural patterns. Opportunities for migrations increased as the peopling of the Sahara occurred during the Holocene climatic optimum (9,000 to 5,000 years B.P.), however more recently there has been a displacement of N. Africa's indigenous peoples by immigrants from Phonecia, Aegean Sea, Italy, Arabia. Contrasting with North Africa, the expansive trends within Europe during the Holocene there has been marked redistribution of Africans indigenous peoples during the late Holocene.

The clustering of genetic associations with Northwest Africans and Eastern Mediterraneans have to be viewed within a background of poor sampling in Northeast Africa, Chad, and many other areas of Africa. With regard to the different results of the Neighbor-Joining trees in different studies, one problem is that A30-B18 is a major component, and yet most studies up until 2002, including gene typing studies failed to achieve a full typing of the HLA-A locus. The most recent studies of Corsicans and Sardinians (2002 and 2003) typed some HLA-A at high resolution but many, including A30, were typed at low resolution. This is a common problem creating false assumptions over a wide area of molecular anthropology. The assumption is that since two alleles are closely related they should have similar distributions. However comparing the distribution of A*3001 and A*3002 indicates A*3001 is spread widely with a bimodal distribution (India and West Africa) and its distribution includes regional populations at the periphery of the Old World, whereas A*3002 is spread over East and Northwest Africa and the Western Mediterranean, with frequencies that fall quickly moving East to West along the Northeastern Indian Ocean from Southern Arabia. Consequently, the early analysis were blending two alleles together as a single allele, one which had a global distribution and the other which had a more West African/Western Mediterranean distribution.
