= CW7 =

CW7 or CW 7 may refer to:

== U.S. television stations affiliated with The CW ==
=== Current ===
- KAII-DT2 in Wailuku, Hawaii
  - A satellite station for KHON-DT2 in Honolulu, Hawaii
- KAZT-TV in Prescott–Phoenix, Arizona
- KMNF-DT2 in Mankato, Minnesota
- KPLC-DT2 in Lake Charles, Louisiana
- KVIA-DT2 in El Paso, Texas
- KVII-DT2 in Amarillo, Texas
- WSAW-DT4 in Wausau, Wisconsin
- WSPA-TV in Spartanburg–Greenville–Anderson, South Carolina–Asheville, North Carolina
- WTVW in Evansville, Indiana

=== Former ===
- WWMT-DT2 in Kalamazoo, Michigan (2006–2023; formerly branded by its cable channel number as CW 7)

== Other uses ==
- CW7, a CW postcode area for the post town of Winsford in Cheshire, UK
- Czerwiński CW 7, a 1930s Polish aerobatic glider
- HLA-Cw7, a human leukocyte antigen serotype
- CW7, a designation for convoy routes in the English Channel during the Kanalkampf of WWII
