= DQ4 =

DQ4 could refer to:

- Dragon Quest IV: Chapters of the Chosen, a video game published by Enix (now Square Enix)
- HLA-DQ4, a Human leukocyte antigen HLA-DQ serotype that recognizes the DQB1*04 gene products
