= DQ8 =

DQ8 may refer to:

- Dragon Quest VIII, a 2004 role-playing game.
- HLA-DQ8, an HLA-DQ receptor serotype associated with coeliac disease.
