= HLA-DQ6 =

Human leukocyte antigen serotype

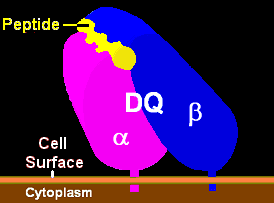
- Illustration of HLA-DQ with bound peptide
- Polymer type: MHC Class II, DQ cell surface antigen
Cis-haplotype		Haplotype
isoform	subtype	DQA1	DQB1
DQ α^{1.3}β^{6.1}	DQ6.1	*0103	*0601
DQ α^{1.2}β^{6.2}	DQ6.2	*0102	*0602
DQ α^{1.3}β^{6.3}	DQ6.3	*0103	*0603
DQ α^{1.2}β^{6.4}	DQ6.4	*0102	*0604

Rare haplotypes
Cis-haplotype		Haplotype
isoform	subtype	DQA1	DQB1
DQ α^{1.2}β^{6.3}	DQ6.3v	*0102	*0603
DQ α^{1.3}β^{6.2}	DQ6.2v	*0103	*0602
DQ α^{1.2}β^{6.9}	DQ6.9	*0102	*0609

HLA-DQ6 (DQ6) is a human leukocyte antigen serotype within HLA-DQ (DQ) serotype group. The serotype is determined by the antibody recognition of β^{6} subset of DQ β-chains. The β-chain of DQ isoforms are encoded by HLA-DQB1 locus and DQ6 are encoded by the HLA-DQB1*06 allele group. This group currently contains many common alleles, DQB1*0602 is the most common. HLA-DQ6 and DQB1*06 are almost synonymous in meaning. DQ6 β-chains combine with α-chains, encoded by genetically linked HLA-DQA1 alleles, to form the cis-haplotype isoforms. For DQ6, however, cis-isoform pairing only occurs with DQ1 α-chains. There are many haplotypes of DQ6.

== Serology ==
DQ6, DQ1, and DQ5 recognition of some Some DQB1* alleles
	DQ6	DQ1	DQ5	N
allele	%	%	%	size (N)
*0601	64	23		675
*0602	67	30	1	5151
*0603	62	23	2	2807
*0604	59	27	2	1592
*0605	76	13		358
*0609	48	32	3	149

== Alleles ==
HLA DQB1*0601 frequencies
		freq
ref.	Population	(%)
	Indig. Australian Cape York	31.3
	Indig. Australian Kimberly	30.5
	Nauru	28.4
	Fiji Viti Levu	26.3
	India Bombay	26.3
	Papua New Guinea Lowland	26.0
	China Guizhou Prov. Miao	25.9
	Papua New Guinea Madang	23.1
	Kiribati	22.6
	Japan	22.0
	Indonesia Nusa Tenggara	19.2
	India North Hindus	18.7
	Japan Hokkaido Wajin	17.0
	Uttar Pradesh Hindu	15.1
	PNG Lowland Wosera	14.1
	Western Samoa & Tokelau	13.7
	Pakistan Kalash	13.0
	India Lucknow	12.9
	China Wuhan	12.8
	South Korea (4)	11.4
	PNG Highland	10.9
	India Delhi	9.0
	Iran Baloch	8.0
	Mongolia Khalkha	5.5
	Lebanon Yuhmur	4.3
	Tunisia Ghannouch	4.3
	Poland Wielkopolska	4.0
	Mexico Mazatecans	3.5
	Spain E. Andalusia	2.0
	Italy Central	1.9
	France South East	1.6
	England Caucasoid	1.1
	Ireland South	0.2
	Italy Sardinia	0.1
	Brazil Guarani Kaiowa	0.0
	Cameroon Saa	0.0

=== DQB1*0601 ===
DQB1*0601 is generally linked to DQA1*0103 as 6.1 haplotype. This haplotype is more common in Japan and other parts of East Asia.

HLA DQB1*0602 frequencies
		freq
ref.	Population	(%)
	Spain Pas Valley	31.5
	Cameroon Saa	30.8
	Congo Kinshasa Bantu	30.0
	PNG E. Highlands Goroka	29.8
	Siberia Ket Lower Yenisey	29.4
	Spain North Cabuernigo	28.9
	Russia Arkhangelsk Pomors	24.7
	Spain North Cantabrian	24.7
	Ireland South	19.6
	Belgian (2)	19.4
	Siberia Kushun Buryat	18.0
	Finland	17.1
	Siberia Kets Sulamai Village	17.0
	Poland Wielkopolska	16.9
	German Essen	16.7
	Sp. Basque Arratia Valley	16.7
	Denmark	16.6
	France Ceph	15.7
	Kenya	14.6
	England Caucasoid	14.4
	Sweden	14.1
	France Rennes	13.8
	Tunisia Matmata Berber	11.7
	Jordan Amman	10.7
	Japan Hokkaido Wajin	10.0
	Saudi A. Guraiat & Hail	8.4
	Japan Central	8.2
	Nauru	8.2
	Georgia Svaneti Svans	8.1
	France South East	8.0
	Ethiopia Amhara	7.7
	Algeria Oran	7.6
	Slovenia	7.5
	South Korea (1)	7.4
	Japan Fukuoka	6.4
	Pakistan Kalash	5.8
	China Xinjiang Uygur	5.4
	Papua New Guinea Lowland	5.2
	Mongolia Khalkh Ulaanbaatar	4.9
	Spain Murcia	4.8
	India Bombay	4.2
	Japan	4.0
	Greece (2)	3.3
	Israel Arabs	2.3
	Vietnam Hanoi Kinh	2.0
	Israel Jews	1.5
	Mongolia Khoton Tarialan	1.2
	USA Alaska Yupik Natives	0.8
	Mexico Mixtec Oaxaca	0.5
	Italy Sardinia pop2	0.1

=== DQB1*0602 ===
DQB1*0602 is commonly linked to DQA1*0102 to form 6.2 haplotype. DQ6.2 and is common from Central Asia into Western Europe, *0602 is also linked to DQA1*0103 in parts of Asia.

HLA DQB1*0603 frequencies
		freq
ref.	Population	(%)
	Georgia Svaneti Svans	14.4
	France West	11.0
	Netherlands	10.6
	German Essen	9.2
	Czech Republic	9.0
	Spain Murcia	8.7
	Slovakia	8.4
	Denmark	8.3
	India Lucknow	8.3
	Jordan Amman	8.3
	France Rennes	8.1
	Poland Wielkopolska	8.0
	Saudi Arabia Guraiat & Hail	8.0
	Tunisia Jerba Berber	7.8
	Uganda Muganda Baganda	7.4
	Spain North Cantabrian	7.2
	Finland	7.1
	France South	6.9
	China Xinjiang Uygur	6.5
	Russia Northwest Slavic	6.0
	Ireland Donegal	5.3
	Greece (3)	5.2
	Ireland Northern (2)	4.9
	Italy Rome	4.0
	CAR Aka Pygmies	3.6
	Lebanon Kafar Zubian	3.2
	Sweden	2.5
	Thailand	2.1
	China Wuhan	1.7
	Japan (2)	1.0
	South Korea (3)	0.9
	Malaysia	0.6

=== DQB1*0603 ===
DQB1*0603 is commonly linked to DQA1*0103 as 6.3 and is common from Central Asia into Western Europe, *0603 is also linked to DQA1*0102 in parts of Asia. In Europe it is most common in the Netherlands.

HLA DQB1*0604 frequencies
		freq
ref.	Population	(%)
	Ethiopia Amhara	10.7
	Rwanda Kigali Hutu and Tutsi	10.7
	Ethiopia Oromo	10.2
	Japan	8.0
	Saudi Arabia Guraiat & Hail	8.0
	Iran Yazd Zoroastrians	6.9
	CAR Aka Pygmies	6.5
	South Korea (2)	6.5
	Sweden	6.1
	Netherlands	5.6
	Uganda Muganda Baganda	5.3
	Lebanon Niha el Shouff	4.9
	Denmark	4.6
	France Rennes	4.6
	Israel Gaza Palestinians	3.9
	China Xinjiang Uygur	3.8
	Algeria1	3.5
	Russia Northwest Slavic	3.5
	England Caucasoid	3.1
	German Essen	2.6
	Czech Republic	2.4
	Greece	2.0
	India Delhi	1.8
	Nauru	1.5
	Finland	1.4
	Gambia	0.7

=== DQB1*0604 ===
DQB1*0604 is found at higher frequencies in parts Africa and Asia and is linked almost exclusively to DQA1*0102 as 6.4. This haplotype is found at its highest Eurasian frequencies in Japan.

HLA DQB1*0609 frequencies
		freq
ref.	Population	(%)
	Rwanda Kigali Hutu & Tutsi	5.7
	Kenya	5.3
	Uganda Muganda Baganda	5.3
	Congo Kinshasa Bantu	4.4
	Gambia	4.4
	Mongolia Tsaatan	4.2
	South Korea (3)	3.7
	Cameroon Saa	3.5
	Slovenia	3.0
	Tunisia	3.0
	Zimbabwe Harare Shona	2.2
	Vietnam Hanoi Kinh	2.0
	Netherlands	1.7
	Saudi Arabia Guraiat & Hail	1.6
	Algeria Oran	1.5
	Greece (2)	1.2
	Thailand (2)	1.2
	Tunisia Matmata Berber	1.2
	Italy Rome	1.0
	Spain Granada	0.7
	Italy Bergamo	0.6
	Ireland South	0.2
	China Ürümqi Uygur	0.0
	USA Alaska Yupik Natives	0.0

=== DQB1*0609 ===
DQB1*0609 is found in Africa and proximal regions of Eurasia.

== Haplotypes and disease ==
Susceptibility to Leptospirosis infection was found associated with undifferentiated DQ6. Whereas DQ6 was protective against death (or need for liver transplantion) in primary sclerosing cholangitis.

=== DQ6.1 ===
DQA1*0103:DQB1*0601 (DQ6.1) is found at increased frequencies in Asia and is almost absent in Western Europe. It confers protection from narcolepsy, juvenile diabetes, Vogt-Koyanagi-Harada (VKH) syndrome, pemphigus vulgaris, multiple sclerosis, myasthenia gravis.

=== DQ6.2 ===
DQ6.2 (DQA1*0102 : DQB1*0602) is commonly linked to DR15 and as such is part of the HLA B7-DR15-DQ6 haplotype. This haplotype is considered to be the longest multigene haplotype known within the human genome as it covers over 4.7 million nucleotides. The DR15-DQ6.2 haplotype is the most common DR-DQ haplotype in Europe, and approximately 30% of Americans carry at least DQ6.2. The haplotype is even more common in Central Asia.

==== DQ6.2 associations with disease ====
For myasthenia gravis, recognition α34-49 of AChR increased with DQ6.2. DQA1*0102 increases risk cervical cancer. In multiple sclerosis DQA1*0102 was the most frequent allele and DQB1*0602 increased significantly in the MS patients.

==== Protective effects of DQ6.2 ====
In primary biliary cirrhosis DQ6.2 appears to have a negative association with disease. DQ6.2 also appears to have a protective effect in juvenile diabetes. DQ6.2 is also protective against infantile spasms in mestizos.

=== DQ6.3 ===
DQ6.3 (DQA1*0103 : DQB1*0603) is found in northcentral Europe at moderate frequencies, it is a protective against many autoimmune diseases. It also affords some protection to HIV infection.

=== DQ6.4 ===
DQ6.4 (DQA1*0102 : DQB1*0604) might be associated with thymoma-induced myasthenia gravis.
