= HLA-DQ5 =

Human leukocyte antigen serotype

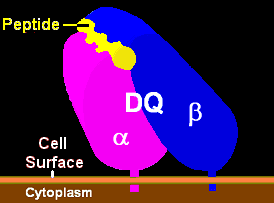
- Illustration of HLA-DQ with gliadin peptide in the binding pocket.
- Polymer type: MHC Class II, DQ cell surface antigen
Cis-haplotype		Haplotype
isoform	subtype	DQA1	DQB1
DQ α^{1.1}β^{5.1}	DQ5.1	*0101	*0501
DQ α^{1.2}β^{5.2}	DQ5.2	*0102	*0502
DQ α^{1.4}β^{5.3}	DQ5.3	*0104	*0503

HLA-DQ5 (DQ5) is a human leukocyte antigen serotype subgroup within HLA-DQ(DQ) serotypes. The serotype is determined by the antibody recognition of β^{5.x} subset of DQ β-chains. The β-chain of DQ is encoded by HLA-DQB1 locus and DQ5 are encoded by the HLA-DQB1*05 allele group. This group currently contains 4 common alleles, DQB1*0501, *0502, *0503, and *0504. HLA-DQ5 and HLA-DQB1*05 are almost synonymous in meaning. DQ5 β-chains combine with α-chains, encoded by genetically linked HLA-DQA1 alleles, to form the cis-haplotype isoforms. These isoforms, are all HLA-DQ1 encoded by the DQA1*01 allele group.

== Serology ==
DQ5, DQ1, and DQ6 recognition of some DQB1* alleles
DQB1*	DQ5	DQ1	DQ6	Sample
allele	%	%	%	size (N)
*0501	69	20	2	5536
*0502	48	24	15	919
*0503	58	22	4	1327
*0504	59	17	2	48
Red indicates the level of 'false' reaction in non-DQ5 serotypes

The efficiency of DQ1 recognition relative to DQ5 and DQ6 is listed above. Since DQ1 recognizes alpha, the DQ5 and DQ6 recognition are to beta chain. Meaning that DQ1 is corecognized with DQ5 and DQ6. Efficient recognition of a genotyped allele approaches 100%. Compared to DQ2 serotyping of DQB1*0201 positive individuals (98%), the efficiency of DQ5 recognition is relatively low and error prone.

While DQ5 recognizes DQB1*05 alleles more efficiently than DQ1, the serotyping is rather poor method of typing for transplantation or disease association prediction or study.

== Disease associations ==
=== By serotype ===
DQ5 is negatively associated with (protective against) idiopathic nephrotic syndrome in Polish children, and adrenocortical failure (Addison's disease).

A study on the relationship between HLA-DR, DQ antigen, and intracranial aneurysm in the Han nationality show DQ5 more likely, AIDP type of Guillain Barré syndrome, and irritable bowel disease but not crohn's disease in the same (Jewish) population. Other studies show DQ5 is associated with extra-intestinal manifestations of Crohn's.

DQ5 is shown to be associated with increased risk of gastric mucosal atrophy in Helicobacter pylori infected subjects.

DQ5 appears to be associated with analgesic intolerance.

=== By haplotype ===
MuSK antibody-positive myasthenia gravis HLA-DR14-DQ5, probably DRB1*1402 : DQA1*0104 : DQB1*0503 (DR14-DQ5). DR1-DQ5 is associated with sensitivity to acid anhydrides.
