= HLA-DQ9 =

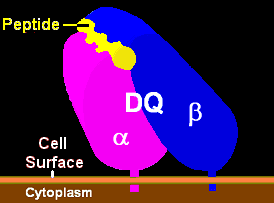
- Illustration of HLA-DQ with bound peptide.
- Polymer type: MHC Class II, DQ cell surface antigen
Cis-haplotype		Haplotype
isoform	subtype	DQA1	DQB1
DQ α^{2}β^{9}	DQ9.2	*0201	*0303
DQ α^{3}β^{9}	DQ9.3	*0302	*0303

HLA-DQ9 (DQ9) is a human leukocyte antigen serotype within the HLA-DQ (DQ) serotype group. DQ9 is a split antigen of the DQ3 broad antigen. DQ9 is determined by the antibody recognition of β^{9} and this generally detects the gene product of DQB1*0303.

== Serology ==
DQ2, DQ3, DQ7, DQ8, and DQ9 recognition of DRB1*0303 product
	DQ9	DQ3	DQ2	DQ7	DQ8	sample
	%	%	%	%	%	(N)
*0303	67	12	11	1	1	2563
Red indicates the level of 'false' reaction in non-DQ9 serotypes
Alleles link-out to IMGT/HLA Databease at EBI

The serotyping efficiency of DQ9 is poor. The recognition of DQB1*0303 by DQ9 and or DQ3 is poorest, DQ2 which recognizes a different DQB1 subgroup recognizes DQB1*0303 as efficiently as DQ3. For this reason DQ9 serotyping is a poor method of typing for transplantation or disease association prediction or study.

== DQB1*0303 ==
(DQ9) is associated with nasal polyps, gestational diabetes, microscopic polyangiitis (Japanese). Primary linkage is with DRB1*0901-DQB1*0303

== Haplotypes and disease ==
=== DQ9.2 ===
DQA1*0201:DQB1*0303 is associated with type I psoriasis (vulgaris),

=== DQ9.3 ===
DQA1*0302:DQB1*0303 maybe associated with juvenile diabetes in the orient. (Chinese) Primary linkage of vitiligo is with DQA1*03-DQB1*0303.
