= HLA-DQ2 =

Human leukocyte antigen serotype

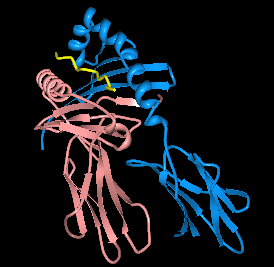
- Illustration of HLA-DQ2.5 with deamidated gliadin peptide in the binding pocket.1s9v
- Polymer type: MHC Class II, DQ
Cis-haplotype		Haplotype
isoform	subtype	DQA1	DQB1
DQ α^{2}β^{2}	DQ2.2	*0201	*0202
DQ α^{3}β^{2}	DQ2.3	*0303	*0202
DQ α^{5}β^{2}	DQ2.5	*0501	*0201

HLA-DQ2 (DQ2) is a serotype group within HLA-DQ (DQ) serotyping system. The serotype is determined by the antibody recognition of β^{2} subset of DQ β-chains. The β-chain of DQ is encoded by HLA-DQB1 locus and DQ2 are encoded by the HLA-DQB1*02 allele group. This group currently contains two common alleles, DQB1*0201 and DQB1*0202. HLA-DQ2 and HLA-DQB1*02 are almost synonymous in meaning. DQ2 β-chains combine with α-chains, encoded by genetically linked HLA-DQA1 alleles, to form the cis-haplotype isoforms. These isoforms, nicknamed DQ2.2 and DQ2.5, are also encoded by the DQA1*0201 and DQA1*0501 genes, respectively.

DQ2 is most common in Western Europe, North Africa and East Africa. Highest frequencies are observed in parts of Spain and Ireland; this distribution correlates with the frequency of two of the most prevalent autoimmune diseases. There is also an increase in DQB1*0201 in Central Asia, peaking in Kazakhstan and declining slowly west to east into China and finally Southeast Asia. DQA1*0501 : DQB1*0201. DQ2.5 is one of the most predisposing factors for autoimmune disease. DQ2.5 is encoded, often, by a haplotype associated with a large number of diseases. This haplotype, HLA A1-B8-DR3-DQ2, is associated with diseases in which HLA-DQ2 has suspect involvement. Direct involvement of DQ2 is certain in coeliac disease (also known as celiac disease).

== Serology ==
DQB1*02 serotyping
DQB1*	DQ2	Sample
allele	%	size (N)
*0201	98	9175
*0202	87	656

DQA1-B1 haplotypes in Americans of European genetic ancestry
DQ	DQ	DQ			Freq
Serotype	cis-isoform	Subtype	A1	B1	%		^{rank}
DQ2	α^{5}-β^{2}	2.5	0501^{♣}	0201	13.	16	^{2nd}
DQ2	α^{2}-β^{2}	2.2	0201	0202	11.	08	^{3rd}
DQ2	α^{3}-β^{2}	2.3	0302^{♠}	0202	0.	08
^{♠}DQA1*0302 & *0303 not resolved; ^{♣}DQB1*0501 & *0505, and some *0303 are resolvable by haplotype

Serotyping efficiency. The serotyping efficiency of HLA-DQ2 is among the highest of the antisera. DQ2 antibodies can be used to effectively type DQ2 bearing individuals, however antibody may detect DQB1*0303.

== Alleles ==
=== DQB1*0201 ===
The DQB1*0201 allele is genetically linked to DQA1*0501 and DRB1*03. With DQA1*0501 it forms the DQ2.5_{cis} encoding haplotype, with DRB1*03 it becomes part of the DR3-DQ2 (DR-DQ) serologically defined haplotype. With DQA1*0501 the allele is most frequently found in coeliac disease. With DR3 this DQ2 has the second strongest linkage to Type 1 diabetes, and when paired with HLA-DQ8 is the most abundant phenotype found in late onset, "Type1-Type2" diabetes mellitus type 1. As the incidence of coeliac disease is about 1% this allele is associated with more autoimmune disease relative to any other DQ haplotype.

There are ambiguities regarding DQB1*0201 in the literature, some low resolution typing kits detect *0202 as *0201 and are presented as *0201 in the literature without distinction. DQB1*0201 in Europe is frequently found in the HLA A1-B8-DR3-DQ2 haplotype.

=== DQB1*0202 ===
This allele is linked to several DQA1* alleles, the linkage with DQA1*0201 forms the DQ2.2 haplotype and linkage with DQA1*0303 forms the DQ2.3 haplotype. In Africa the DQA1*0501 haplotype is also linked rarely to DQB1*0202 and may represent that ancestral form of the DQ2.5 haplotype.

== DQ2 isoforms and DQ2 haplotypes ==
Understanding DQ Haplotypes and DQ isoforms
DQ haplotypes

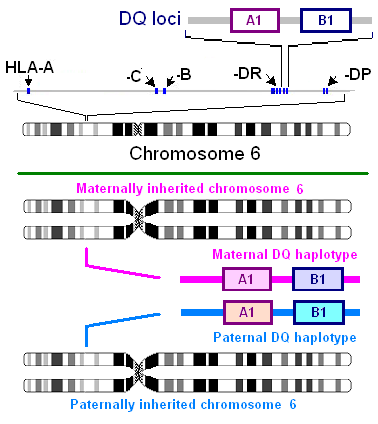
Illustration of DQ antigen genetics, click image for details

Each individual has 22 pairs of autosomes. The HLA complex in humans is a large region, ~3 million nucleotides, on chromosome 6, within this region there are a large number of genes. The DQ represent 2 genetic loci that lie next to each other. One gene is called DQA1 and the other is called DQB1. There are many alleles at each genetic locus.
Further information: HLA-DQA1 and HLA-DQB1

DQ antigen, a cell surface receptor, is composed of two polypeptide subunits. There are dozens of alleles at each locus and many create unique subunit isoforms. There are a large number of possible combinations. Evolution of humans has limited the most common isoforms. These are more common isoforms encoded by haplotypes, almost all of the time, one passed without change from a person's mother and father from conception. Each allele at each locus has an official name. For the alpha subunit the names are given by the gene-alleles. For example, the major DQ1 alleles are given as DQA1*0101, *0102, *0103, *0104. DQ1 refers to the DQ α1 groups of isoforms (historically by serotype) which is the 01 portion of the allele number, the last two digits identify a specific allele in that group. All other DQ serotypes refer to beta chain groups — DQ2, DQ3-(DQ7, DQ8, DQ9), DQ4, DQ5, DQ6. A common way to write a phenotype (both alleles a person has) as DQA1*0101/*0102. This is not enough information to identify a person's isoforms. We also need information about beta chain, the best way to do this is to refer to common haplotypes. HLA-DQ haplotypes are commonly written in a style: HLA-DQA1*0101:DQB1*0501. When considering a person's haplo-phenotype the form DQA1*0102:DQB1*0602/DQA1*0501:DQB1*0201 is the same as DQA1*0102/*0501 DQB1*0602/*0201. When drawn out the form can be used to identify all potential isoforms. (See image below)

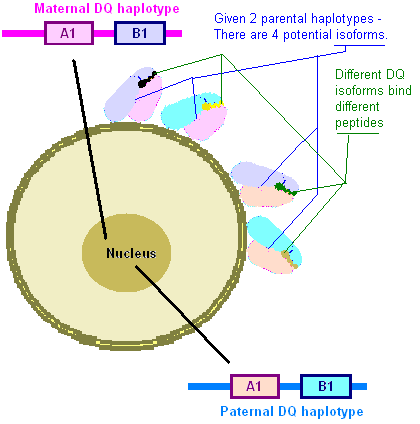
Relationship of haplotypes to antigens

There are many potential DQ isoforms as a result of cis- and trans-haplotype pairing (see image on left). Of course the cis-haplotypes are more common. Typically most individuals can produce 4 isoforms, but the 2 isoforms tend to be the most abundant. There are instances where this may not be true, such as when the two betas or two alphas are very similar in structure. Most important with regard to isoforms - different subunit isoform pairings can result in the binding of different foreign or self antigens. From a disease defense perspective the more different kinds of peptides that can be presented, the more likely the immune system will detect pathogens and remove them quickly. As a consequence the HLA genes are kept extremely variable in most mammalian populations relative to other genes.
DQ2.5 and gluten sensitivity

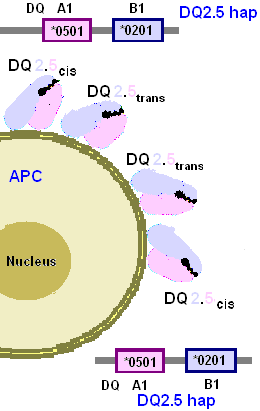
Isoform pairings in DQ2.5 homozygotes result in one isoform

For coeliac disease however there appears to be one isoform that has a higher role. This isoform is DQ α5-β2 (DQ2.5). Because the beta chain is β2, historically it has been called DQ2. Not all DQ2 isoforms are pathogenic, but at least 2 appear to be more associated with disease. DQ2.5 isoform is not rare, 25% of Americans Caucasians carry the isoform, whereas >90% of people with coeliac disease carry the isoform. DQ2 is also increased in gluten-sensitive idiopathic neuropathy. The DQA1*0501:DQB1*0201 haplotype is the most frequent source of DQ2.5 isoform called DQ2.5_{cis}. It is found in almost all celiacs and the haplotype is frequently called, also, DQ2.5 haplotype.

Risk for disease tends to be carried in families because of the DQ2.5_{cis} encoding haplotypes. Atypically about 3% of coeliacs get DQ2.5 isoform as a result of trans-chromosomal encoding. This can occur because one DQ haplotype, DQA1*0505:DQB1*0301 (DQ7.5) produces an alpha chain in which the variable portion relative to DQA1*0501 is chopped off during processing to DQ heterodymer.

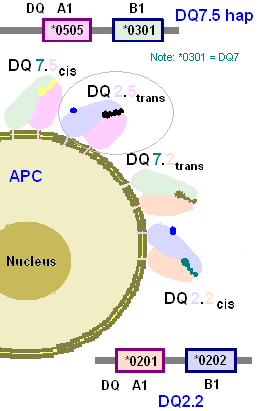
Isoform pairings in DQ7.5/DQ2.2 result in 4 proteins isoforms, DQ2.5trans isoform is one(circled)

Therefore, it can produce the α5 subunit. The DQ2.2 haplotypes provide the β2 subunit, and consequently DQ7.5/DQ2.2 phenotype creates the DQ2.5_{trans} isoform.

The DQ isoform has a complex genetic involvement in coeliac disease. And these involvements explain the majority of disease. One other haplotype exists that is associated with disease, although not as common in Europe, DQ8 is found to be involved in coeliac disease in peoples where DQ2 is not present. DQ8.1 haplotype encodes the DQA1*0301:DQB1*0302 haplotype and represents the overwhelming majority of all DQ8. DQ2.5 is generally highest in northern, islandic Europe, and the Basque of Northern Spain. Phenotype frequency exceeds 50% in certain parts of Ireland. DQ8 is extremely high in Native Americans of Central America and tribes of Eastern American origin, fortunately most of these peoples have retained a maize-based diet.

=== DQ2.5 ===
DQ2.5 refers to either a protein isoform and a genetic (chromosomal) haplotype. DQ2.5 isoform or heterodimer is shorthand for the cell surface receptor HLA-DQ α^{5}β^{2}. Frequently called 'the DQ2 heterodimer', the DQ2.5 isoform is actually one of two common DQ heterodimers, the other being DQ2.2. DQ2.5 haplotype is created by close genetic linkage of two alleles, written as a haplotype, DQA1*0501:DQB1*0201. The haplotype encodes DQ2.5_{cis} isoform, referring to the cis arrangement of the DQA1*0501 and DQB1*0201 on the same variant of chromosome 6. The isoform can also be encoded trans-haplotype (between two sister chromosomes) forming the DQ2.5_{trans} isoform. This isoform occurs when a person has the DQ7.5/DQ2.2 phenotype.

DQ2.5 and the linked DR3 are associated with probably the greatest frequency of autoimmune occurrence relative to any other haplotypes. The haplotype is positively associated with coeliac disease, dermatitis herpetiformis, juvenile diabetes, Lambert–Eaton myasthenic syndrome (LEMS), Sjögren syndrome, and autoimmune hepatitis (although significant proportion of the risk is secondary to coeliac disease). DR3 and/or DQ2.5 are linked to the following diseases: Moreen's ulceration, "bout onset" multiple sclerosis, Graves' disease and systemic lupus erythematosus.

=== DQ2.2 ===
DQ2.2 is shorthand for the DQ α^{2}β^{2} heterodimeric isoform. The isoform is encoded almost exclusively by the DQA1*0201:DQB1*0202 haplotype. The haplotype is linked to DR7. A small percentage of coeliac disease are associated with this haplotype, and some disease causing gliadins are presented by DQ2.2. The haplotype is found at high frequencies in the Mediterranean and West Africa. The Eurasian geographic distribution of DQ2.2 is slightly greater than DQ2.5. Compared to DQ2.5, the frequency in Sardinia is low, but in Iberia it is high reaching a maximum frequency of ~30% in Northern Iberia, and half that in the British Isles. It extends along the Mediterranean and Africa at relatively high frequency and is found in high frequencies in some Central Asian, Mongolians, and Han Chinese. It does not appear to have an indigenous presence in the West Pacific Rim or the New World and DQ2.2 presence in Southeast Asia and Indonesia is likely the result of gene flow from India and China in post-Neolithic times. The haplotype shows considerable diversity in Africa and this has translated to Iberia with 2 addition haplotypes, DQA1*0303:DQB1*0202 and DR7:DQA1*0201:DQB1*0303. The expansion of DQ2.2 into Europe appears to have been slightly later or biased by some constriction between Iberia and the rest of the continent.

=== DQ2.3 ===
DQ2.3 is shorthand for the DQ α^{3}β^{2} heterodimeric isoform. The isoform is encoded by DQA1*0303:DQB1*0202 haplotype. The isoform can also be produced by phenotypes were one haplotype is DQ4.3, DQ7.3, DQ8.1, DQ9.3 and the other haplotype is DQ2.2 or DQ2.5. Therefore, the haplotype encoded receptor is a DQ2.3_{cis} isoform which is genetically linked to DR7 By serology DR7-DQ2 cannot discriminate DQ2.2 from DQ2.3 haplotypes, and therefore DQA1 typing is required.

=== Other isoforms ===
DQ2 beta chains can pair with trans to other alpha chain. However, there is no precedence in cis isoforms for DQ2, 4, 7, 8, or 9 binding DQ1 (DQA1*01) alpha chains. DQA1*03, *05 chains process to near identical alpha chains. The *04 chain can potentially complex with DQ2 forming DQ2.4. In East Asia there is the possibility of DQ2.6 resulting from pairing with DQA1*0601.

== In coeliac disease ==
DQ2 represents the second highest risk factor for coeliac disease, the highest risk is a close family member with disease. Due to its link to coeliac disease, DQ2 has the highest association of any HLA serotype with autoimmune disease, close to 95% of all coeliacs have DQ2, of that 30% have 2 copies of DQ2. Of the DQ2 homozygotes who eat wheat, lifelong risk is between 20 and 40% for coeliac disease.

The relationship of DQ2 and coeliac disease, however, is complex because there are multiple DQ2 isoforms. The DQ α^{5}β^{2} (DQ2.5) isoform is strongly associated with CD. This isoform is partially encoded by the DQB1*02 genes in HLA-DQ2 positive individuals. DQB1*0201 is genetically linked to DQA1*0501 forming the DQ2.5 haplotype that encodes both α^{5} and β^{2} subunits. The DQ2.5 haplotype confers the single highest genetic risk for disease, however comparable risk can also come from very similar alleles on different haplotypes.

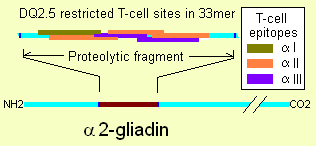
Illustration of deamidated alpha-2 gliadin's 33mer showing the overlapping of three varieties of T-cell epitope.

The immunodominant site for DQ2.5 is on α2-gliadin. The site is a protease resistant 33mer that has 6 overlapping DQ2.5 restricted epitopes. This creates very strong binding of T-cells for DQ2.5-33mer complexes. DQ2.5 binds gliadin, but the binding is sensitive to deamidation caused by tissue transglutaminase. In almost all case the highest affinity sites of gluten are derived by deamidation. The HLA DQB1*0202 and its linked DQA1* alleles (the DQ2.2 haplotype) do not produce the α^{5} subunit. While the DQ2.2 heterodimer cannot effectively present α-2 gliadin, it can present other gliadins. In at least 1% of coeliacs DQ2.2 confers adaptive immunity to gliadin permitting coeliac disease.

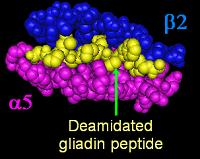
DQ α^{5}-β^{2} -binding cleft with a deamidated gliadin peptide (yellow), modified from PDB: 1S9V

=== DQ2.5 and gluten ===
As mentioned the DQA1*0501:DQB1*0201 haplotype produces DQ2.5_{cis} which by frequency and efficiency in alpha-gliadin presentation is the major factor in adaptive immunity. The isoform, referred to frequently as the DQ2 heterodimer or DQ2 (DQA1*05:DQB1*02) and more recently DQ2.5 can be differentiated from responses from other DQ isoforms, including other DQ2. Specifically, that this DQ2 heterodimer is responsible for presenting the α2-gliadin that most effectively stimulates pathogenic T-cells.

The highest risk for coeliac disease is in Western Ireland and overlaps one of three global nodes of the DQ2.5 haplotype in Western Europe. The DQ2.5 haplotype is linked to DR3 and DR3 is not linked to DQ2.2. Therefore, using either serotyping or genotyping, DQ2.5 can be distinguished from DQ2.2 or DQ2.3. The refined studies of risk and immunology suggest that all DQ2 can mediate coeliac disease, but that DQ2.5 is the primary genetic risk factor. A genome wide survey of markers linked to CD, reveals that highest linkage is for a marker within the DQA1*0501 allele of the DQ2.5 haplotype. The association of DQB1*0201 is almost as high. Greatly elevating risk is the ability of the DQ2.5 haplotype encoded isoforms to increase abundance on the cell surface in DQ2.5 double homozygotes. While most people can form two or four different isoforms of DQ. Double homozygotes (of DQA1 and DQB1) can only form DQ2.5_{cis}. This occurs when a person inherits a DQ2.5cis bearing chromosome from each parent. While the frequency of DQ2.5 haplotype is only 4 times higher than the general population, the number of DQ2.5 homozygotes is 10 to 20 times higher than the general population. Multiple copies of the DQ2.5 haplotype do not cause apparent increases of severity, DQ2.5/DQ2 increases risk of life-threatening complications and more severe histological findings. Of the approximately 90% of coeliacs that bear the DQ2.5 isoform only 4% produce DQ2.5 by pair alleles from different haplotypes, this isoform is called DQ2.5_{trans} and differs slightly, one amino acid, from DQ2.5_{cis}.

=== DQ2.2 and gluten ===
DQ2.2 does not produce all the necessary subunits to efficiently present the most pathogenic gluten proteins to the immune system. With the DQ2.2 isoform (DQ α^{2}-β^{2}), polar substitutions (amino acids such as asparagine, glutamine, glycine, serine, and threonine) are not bound well to DQ2.2. The gliadin peptides that bind DQ2.5 are enriched in the amino acid glutamine. Since the β^{2} provides half the structural information for gluten presentation, other haplotypes might provide the rest. Such haplotypes are known to exist and these haplotypes confer different risk on DQ2.2. DQ2.2 however can present less pathogenic epitopes such as proteolytic peptides of gamma-gliadin. This appears to be the mediator of disease in 1% of coeliacs that are homozygotes for DQ2.2.

The DQ2.2/DQ7.5 phenotype. Also called DQ2.5_{trans} in some publications. DQ7.5 haplotype is the DQA1*0505:DQB1*0301 haplotype. The DQA1*0505 allele is similar to the DQA1*0501 allele of the DQ2.5 haplotype. When DQA1*0505 or DQA1*0501 gene products are processed to the cell surface they become α^{5}. The gene products of DQB1*0202 and DQB1*0201 are almost identical and function similarly. As a result, one isoform produced by the phenotype of two haplotypes, DQ2.2/DQ7.5, is HLA DQ α^{5}β^{2}. A small percentage of coeliac disease patients have this haplotype. The other 3 isoforms are α^{2}β^{2}(DQ2.2), α^{2}β^{7} (DQ7.2), and α^{5}β^{7} (DQ7.5).

DQ2.2/DQ2.5. Random pairing of heterologous DQ alpha and beta isoforms produces 4 different isoforms at 1:1:1:1 ratios. The fraction of DQ2.5 can be 25%. In the case of this phenotype, HLA DQB1*02 alleles are encoded by both chromosome 6 (maternal and paternal derived). Since DQB1*0201 and *0202 function similarly, only two types of isoforms can be produced and the ratio becomes 1:1. This increases the random number of isoforms from 25% to 50% that can cause disease, and as a result increases risk of celiac disease and probably increases risk of severe complications such as refractory celiac disease and lymphoma. These partial homozygotes in the Dutch CD population are approximately 20%, as compared to a randomly expected 3% indicating a sevenfold enrichment.

DQ2.2/DQ8. Among DQ8 positive celiacs without DQ2.5, 1/3 bear DQ2.2 haplotype, about 3 fold higher than random expectation.

DQ2.2/DQ2.2 DQ2.2 homozygotes represent about 1.1% of the celiac population, this is not high relative to controls, but it is very high with the DQ2.5(isoform)-,DQ8-,DQ2+ cohort at 30%. The random expectation is much lower. This fraction of coeliacs is important because they can only produce α^{2}β^{2} and are useful for determining the role of DQ2.2 in coeliac disease.

== Juvenile diabetes association ==
Juvenile diabetes (T1D) has a high association with DQ2.5 and there appears to be link between GSE and early onset male T1D. Anti-tTG antibodies are found elevated in a one-third of T1D patients and there are indicators that Triticeae may be involved but the gluten protein is a type of globulin (Glb1). Recent studies indicate a combination of DQ2.5 and DQ8 (both acid peptide presenters) greatly increase the risk of adult onset Type 1 Diabetes and ambiguous type I/II Diabetes. HLA-DR3 plays a prominent role in autoimmune diabetes. However, DQ2 presence with DR3 decreases the age of onset and the severity of the autoimmune disorder.
