= Major histocompatibility complex, class II, DQ alpha 1 =

Protein-coding gene in the species Homo sapiens

HLA-DQA1
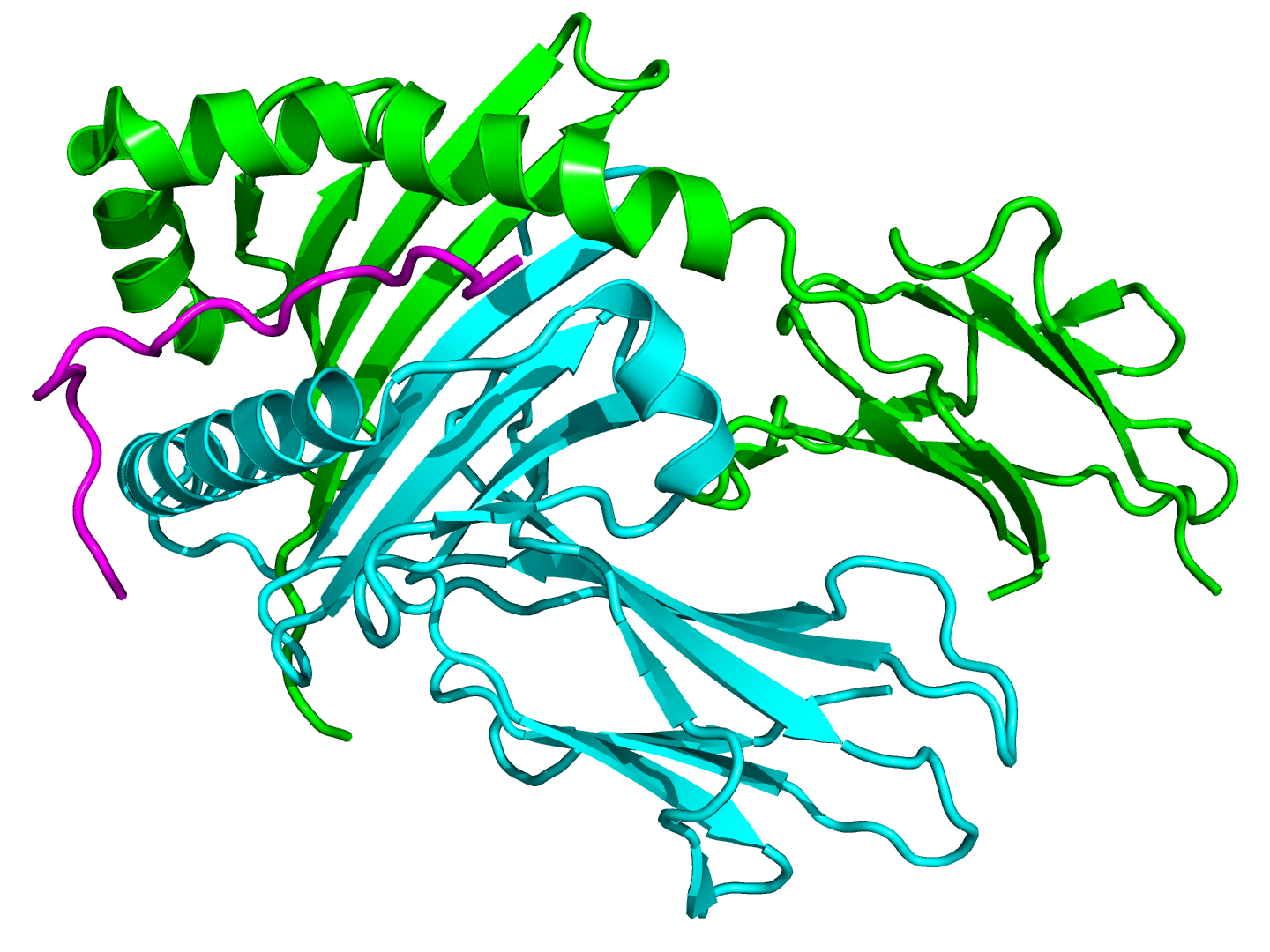

Identifiers
- Aliases: HLA-DQA1, CD, CELIAC1, DQ-A1, GSE, HLA-DQA, Major histocompatibility complex, class II, DQ alpha 1, DQA1
- External IDs: OMIM: 146880; MGI: 95895; GeneCards: HLA-DQA1
Available structures
PDB	Ortholog search: PDBe RCSB
PDB	List of PDB id codes 1JK8, 1S9V, 2NNA, 4GG6, 4OZF, 4OZG, 4OZH, 4OZI

Gene location (Human)
Chr.	Chromosome 6 (human)
Band	6p21.32	Start	32,628,179 bp
Band	6p21.32	End	32,647,062 bp

Gene location (Mouse)
Chr.	Chromosome 17 (mouse)
Band	17 B1|17 17.98 cM	Start	34,501,718 bp
Band	17 B1|17 17.98 cM	End	34,506,797 bp
RNA expression pattern
Bgee	Human / Mouse (ortholog); Top expressed in: gallbladder; rectum; monocyte; granulocyte; right lung; visceral pleura; spleen; decidua; lymph node; skin of hip / Top expressed in: spleen; mesenteric lymph nodes; Paneth cell; thymus; submandibular gland; right lung; right lung lobe; tunica adventitia of aorta; skin of external ear; superior surface of tongue; More reference expression data
BioGPS	n/a
Gene ontology
Molecular function	peptide antigen binding; MHC class II receptor activity; protein binding
Cellular component	integral component of membrane; endocytic vesicle membrane; clathrin-coated endocytic vesicle membrane; endosome; Golgi apparatus; trans-Golgi network membrane; endoplasmic reticulum membrane; membrane; Golgi membrane; plasma membrane; transport vesicle membrane; integral component of plasma membrane; MHC class II protein complex; lysosomal membrane; endoplasmic reticulum; ER to Golgi transport vesicle membrane; lysosome; integral component of lumenal side of endoplasmic reticulum membrane; endosome membrane
Biological process	antigen processing and presentation; antigen processing and presentation of exogenous peptide antigen via MHC class II; interferon-gamma-mediated signaling pathway; immune system process; T cell costimulation; antigen processing and presentation of peptide or polysaccharide antigen via MHC class II; immune response; T cell receptor signaling pathway; adaptive immune response
Sources:Amigo / QuickGO
Orthologs
Databases	NCBI: entry; OMA: entry
Species	Human	Mouse
Entrez	3117	14960
Ensembl	ENSG00000236418; ENSG00000206305; ENSG00000225890; ENSG00000232062; ENSG00000196735 ENSG00000228284	ENSMUSG00000036594
UniProt	P01909	P14434; P14437; P01910; P14435; P14438 P04228; P14436; P04227
RefSeq (mRNA)	NM_002122	NM_010378
RefSeq (protein)	NP_002113	NP_034508
Location (UCSC)	Chr 6: 32.63 – 32.65 Mb	Chr 17: 34.5 – 34.51 Mb
PubMed search
- Wikidata
View/Edit Human	View/Edit Mouse

Major histocompatibility complex, class II, DQ alpha 1, also known as HLA-DQA1, is a human gene present on short arm of chromosome 6 (6p21.3) and also denotes the genetic locus which contains this gene. The protein encoded by this gene is one of two proteins that are required to form the DQ heterodimer, a cell surface receptor essential to the function of the immune system.

== Function ==
HLA-DQA1 belongs to the HLA class II alpha chain paralogues. This class II molecule is a heterodimer consisting of an alpha (DQA) and a beta chain (DQB), both anchored in the membrane. It plays a central role in the immune system by presenting peptides derived from extracellular proteins. Class II molecules are expressed in antigen-presenting cells (APC: B lymphocytes, dendritic cells, macrophages).

== Gene structure and polymorphisms ==
The alpha chain contains 5 exons. Exon one encodes the leader peptide, exons 2 and 3 encode the two extracellular protein domains, exon 4 encodes the transmembrane domain and the cytoplasmic tail. Within the DQ molecule both the alpha chain and the beta chain contain the polymorphisms specifying the peptide binding specificities, resulting in up to 4 different molecules. Typing for these polymorphisms is routinely done for bone marrow transplantation.

== Alleles ==
=== DQ1 ===
There are four commonly encountered DQA1 alleles: DQA1*0101, *0102, *0103, *0104. These alleles are always found in haplotypes with HLA-DQB1*05 (DQ5) and HLA-DQB1*06 (DQ6). DQ1 is a serotype, rare among serotypes for human class II antigens, in that the antibodies to DQ1 react to the alpha chain of HLA DQ, these DQA1 allele gene products.

HLA-DQA1 alleles
	DQA1	linked DQB1 allele					
DQ1	*0101	*0501	*0301				
DQ1	*0102	*0502	*0504	*0602	*0604	*0605	*0609
DQ1	*0103	*0501	*0502	*0601	*0602	*0603	
DQ1	*0104	*0501	*0503	*0602			
DQ1	*0105	rare					
DQ1	*0106	rare					
See haplotype table in HLA-DQ. Unbolded are rare haplotypes
Link to haplotypes can be followed by DQB1 alleles

=== Other ===
The other DQA1 alleles have no defined serotype. There are 5 groups, DQA1*02, *03, *04, *05, *06. DQA1 within these groups are either invariant or produce the same α-chain subunit. DQA1*02 and DQA1*06 contain only one allele. DQA1*03 has three alleles which each produce nearly identical α^{3}. For DQA1*05, the DQA1*0501 and DQA1*0505 produce identical α^{5}. Other DQA1*05 exist that produce variant α^{5var}, but these are rare.

HLA-DQA1 alleles
DQA1	linked DQB1 allele		
*0201	*0202	*0303	
*0301	*0202	*0302	
*0302			
*0303	*0301	*0602	
*0401	*0303	*0401	*0402
*0501	*0201		
*0505	*0301		
*0601	*0301		
See haplotype table in HLA-DQ. Unbolded are rare haplotypes
Link to haplotypes can be followed by DQB1 alleles

== See also ==
- Major histocompatibility complex
- Human leukocyte antigen
- HLA-DQ
