= HLA-DQ4 =

Human leukocyte antigen DQ4 serotype

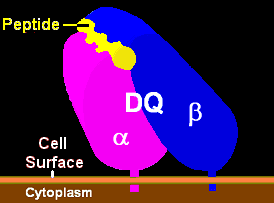
- Illustration of HLA-DQ with gliadin peptide in the binding pocket.
- Polymer type: MHC Class II, DQ cell surface antigen
Cis-haplotype		Haplotype
isoform	subtype	DQA1	DQB1
DQ α^{3}β^{4.1}	DQ4.3a	*0303	*0401
DQ α^{3}β^{4.2}	DQ4.3b	*0303	*0402
DQ α^{4}β^{4.2}	DQ4.2	*0401	*0402

HLA-DQ4 (DQ4) is a serotype subgroup within HLA-DQ(DQ) serotypes. The serotype is determined by the antibody recognition of β^{4} subset of DQ β-chains. The β-chain of DQ is encoded by HLA-DQB1 locus and DQ4 are encoded by the HLA-DQB1*04 allele group. This group currently contains 2 common alleles, DQB1*0401 and DQB1*0402. HLA-DQ4 and HLA-DQB1*04 are almost synonymous in meaning. DQ4 β-chains combine with α-chains, encoded by genetically linked HLA-DQA1 alleles, to form the cis-haplotype isoforms. These isoforms, nicknamed DQ4.3 and DQ4.4, are also encoded by the DQA1*0303 and DQA1*0401 genes, respectively.

== Serotype ==
DQB1*04 serotyping
DQB1*	DQ4	DQ3	Sample
allele	%	%	size (N)
*0401	71	10	176
*0402	86	2	1085
Red indicates the level of 'false' reaction in non-DQ4 serotypes

== Haplotypes ==
=== DQ4.3 ===
DQA1*0303:DQB1*0401 is linked to DRB1*0405 and is common on the west Pacific rim, from Indonesia to Japan and inland areas of Eastern Asia. In Japan it confers susceptibility to juvenile diabetes likely via the DR4 gene.

DQA1*0303:DQB1*0402 is primarily found in Northeastern Asia and the west Pacific rim. It is similar to DQA1*0303:DQB1*0402.

=== DQ4.2 ===
DQA1*0401:DQB1*0402 has a trimodal global distribution. The highest frequencies are found in the highland regions of the new world, peaking in NW Mexico and in the Andes. It is also found at high levels in Namibia and Botswana. Between these two population it is moderately high in the Ainu of northern Japan.

== DQ4 and Disease ==
DQ4 is associated with:

- juvenile diabetic retinopathy

The DR8-DQ4 haplotype is associated with

- papillary thyroid carcinomas
- juvenile idiopathic arthritis via DR8 allele,
- chronic chlamydia infection,
- possibly pemphigus

DR4-DQ4(DRB1*0405:DQB1*0401) is associated with:

- autoimmune pancreatitis,
- juvenile type 1 diabetes,
- rheumatoid arthritis in Japanese.

The DQA1*0303:DQB1*04 haplotype is associated with:

- Crohn's disease in Japanese.

Other diseases mentioned are high-altitude pulmonary edema, Vogt–Koyanagi–Harada disease (DRB1*0405, see above table for Japanese), HIV resistance in the US, and haemophilia A (anti-FVIII inhibitor response).

== DQ4 distribution ==
20 of the most common DR-DQ haplotypes in Japanese
DQ	DR-DQ	DR	DQ		Freq
Serotype	haplotype	B1	A1	B1	%		^{rank}
DQ4	DR4-DQ4	0405	0303	0401	14.	3	²
DQ4	DR4-DQ4	0410	0303	0402	1.	9	^{11}
DQ4	DR8-DQ4	0802	0401	0402	1.	3	^{15}
DQ5	DR1-DQ5	0101	0101	0501	6.	4	^{5}
DQ5	DR14-DQ5	1401	0104	0502	1.	1	^{17}
DQ5	DR14-DQ5	1401	0104	0503	0.	8	^{18}
DQ5	DR14-DQ5	1405	0104	0503	1.	6	^{13}
DQ6	DR8-DQ6	0803	0103	0601	9.	3	^{4}
DQ6	DR13-DQ6	1302	0102	0604	6.	0	^{6}
DQ6	DR15-DQ6	1502	0103	0601	12.	9	³
DQ6	DR15-DQ6	1501	0102	0602	6.	0	^{7}
DQ7	DR11-DQ7	1101	0505	0301	1.	8	^{12}
DQ7	DR12-DQ7	1201	0505	0301	2.	7	^{9}
DQ7	DR12-DQ7	1202	0601	0301	1.	3	^{15}
DQ7	DR14-DQ7	1403	0503	0301	1.	4	^{14}
DQ8	DR4-DQ8	0403	0301	0302	1.	9	^{10}
DQ8	DR4-DQ8	0406	0301	0302	3.	4	^{8}
DQ8	DR8-DQ8	0802	0401	0302	0.	7	^{19}
DQ9	DR9-DQ9	0901	0302	0303	16.	0	^{1}

The table to the left shows the values of Japanese(values converted from phenotype frequencies to haplotype frequencies for sake of consistency) DR-DQ types. This table is presented here because of the diversity of DQ4 types in the Japanese population not seen elsewhere. DQ4 is typically rare most of the world but where it appears more frequently is something of interest. The node of DQ4 is with the DQA1*0401:DQB1*0402 (DQ4.24 for this page) haplotype in Northwestern Mexico and the highland region of western South America reaching 40% haplotype frequencies in that area. Outside of the Indigenous American population DQ4.24 is elevated at 10% in the Ainu of Hokkaidō, Japan. There are a number of other A-B haplotypes that suggest a connection between the Ainu and the Meso-American and Andean populations as well as Lakota Sioux all have DQ4 levels higher than the Ainu. The linkage of DQ4 in Asia appears to be heaviest with DR8 (DR*0801, DR*0802, DR*0804) for DQ4.24 and the frequency is elevated from the Ryukyu Islands to Okhotsk, Ulchi, Negidal, Tofalar at approximately 10% falling off in the Mansi at 4% and punctate levels in between. Haplotype diversity of DQB1*0402 appears to be centered around the Amur River/Japanese Island Chain, and diversity of DQB1*0401 very roughly follows a similar pattern. DQ4.24 is also high in the Swedes however this may be due to east to west gene flow traceable at other HLA loci.

Since DQA1*0401:DQB1*0402 is found in the !Kung, one reasonably assumes it evolved in Africa and migrated with one of several potential waves, probably the earliest. Tracing the migration route is excessively difficult, but it appears that a possible second node of expansion in Central Asia and not the West Pacific Rim/Austro-Indic route postulated as the early human distribution. The most common haplotypes in the !Kung (for example Cw-B) that also appear in Eurasia appear to have been associated with the earliest migration, and is suggestive of a coastal migration; however the relatively high frequencies in the Ainu and Amur basin suggest a migration through the Transbaikal that is consistent with archaeology from about 18 kya. One expects with such a route that Korean would be higher than Japanese and Japanese higher the Ryukyuans still higher than Taiwan aboriginals. From the west gene frequencies in the Levant and Black Sea region are at 'diffusive' levels whereas there are pockets of increased frequency in the Zoroastrians of Yadz region (DQA1*0401 and DQB1*0402). Thus the DR8-DQ4.24 haplotype is probably one of western origin.

The DR4-DQA1*0303:DQB1*040X can be found at high frequencies in PNG highland groups but not DQ4.24. The DR*0405 and DR*410 are found specifically associated with these DQ types and there is some haplotype diversity. So that it appears the presence of the DQA1*03:DQB1*04 is of West Pacific Rim origins in Japanese and proximal Siberians, but unfortunately there is no current typing of these haplotypes in the Taiwan aboriginal population. The presence in Indonesia may be the result of retrograde gene flow that can be established by other HLA types as well as mtDNA.
