= HLA-DQ1 =

Serotype that covers a broad range of HLA-DQ haplotypes

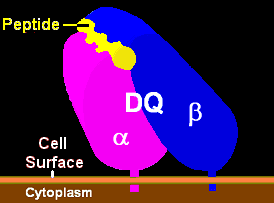
major histocompatibility complex, class II, DQ1
Haplotypes	DQA1*0101:DQB1*0501 DQA1*0101:DQB1*0502 DQA1*0102:DQB1*0502 DQA1*0104:DQB1*0503 DQA1*0103:DQB1*0601 DQA1*0102:DQB1*0602 DQA1*0103:DQB1*0603 DQA1*0102:DQB1*0604 DQA1*0102:DQB1*0605 DQA1*0102:DQB1*0609....
Structure
Identifiers	alpha 1 *0101 *0102 *0103 *0104
Symbol(s)	HLA-DQA1
EBI-HLA	DQA1*0101
EBI-HLA	DQA1*0102
EBI-HLA	DQA1*0103
EBI-HLA	DQA1*0104
Identifiers	beta 1 *05 or *06
Symbol(s)	HLA-DQB1
EBI-HLA	DQB1*05
EBI-HLA	DQB1*06
Shared data
Locus	chr.6 6p21.31

HLA-DQ1 is a serotype that covers a broad range of HLA-DQ haplotypes. Historically it was identified as a DR-like alpha chain called DC1; later, it was among 3 types DQw1 (later DQ1, and split into DQ5 and DQ6), DQw2 and DQw3. Of these three serotyping specificities only DQw1 recognized DQ alpha chain. The serotype is positive in individuals who bear the DQA1*01 alleles. The most frequently found within this group are: DQA1*0101, *0102, *0103, and *0104. In the illustration on the right, DQ1 serotyping antibodies recognizes the DQ α (magenta), where antibodies to DQA1* gene products bind variable regions close to the peptide binding pocket.

== Serotypes ==
Some DRB1* alleles and DQ5, DQ1, DQ6 recognition
DQB1*	DQ5	DQ1	DQ6	Sample
allele	%	%	%	size (N)
0501	69	20	2	5536
0502	48	24	15	919
0503	58	22	4	1327
0504	59	17	2	48
				.
	DQ6	DQ1	DQ5	N
0601	64	23		675
0602	67	30	1	5151
0603	62	23	2	2807
0604	59	27	2	1592
0605	76	13		358
0609	48	32	3	149

The serotyping efficiency of DQ1 recognition relative to DQ5 and DQ6 is listed below. Since DQ1 recognizes alpha, the DQ5 and DQ6 recognition are to beta chain. Meaning that DQ1 is corecognized with DQ5 and DQ6.

The table to the left shows some of the serotyping efficiencies. Efficient recognition of a genotyped allele approaches 100%. Compared to DQ2 serotyping of DQB1*0201 positive individuals (98%), the efficiency of DQ1 recognition is relatively low and error prone.

For this reason DQ1 serotyping is a poor method of typing for transplantation or disease association prediction or study. Nonetheless, it is still widely used and association purported in the literature.

== Alleles ==
=== DQA1*0101 ===
DQA1*0101 is commonly linked to haplotypes of DQB1*05, the common DQA1*0101:DQB1*0501 haplotype which is part of a broader DR1-DQ1 haplotype.

=== DQA1*0102 ===
DQA1*0102 is associated with both DR5 and DR6.

DQA1*0102:DQB1*0502 has a bimodal distribution. It is found in the Philippines in high frequency and on the Mediterranean island of Sardinia.

DQA1*0102:DQB1*0602 is a very common haplotype in Eurasia, with higher frequency in central Asia relative to elsewhere. It is part of a European ancestral haplotype B7-DR15-DQ1 that appears to have expanded asymmetrically into Europe. The A3-B7-DR15-DQ1 haplotype indicates relationships in Eurasia that span from Korea to Ireland, indicating some common ancestry in recent times.

DQA1*0102:DQB1*0604 much less frequently found but spread widely.

=== DQA1*0103 ===
DQA1*0103 (*0103) shows a negative (protective) association with many autoimmune disease, this association is apparent in Japanese studies in the *0103:DQB1*0601 haplotype, and in Europe with the *0103:DQB1*0603 haplotype, indicating the protective effect is influenced by the alpha chain of DQ. DQA1*0103 is protective against Behçet's disease, pemphigus vulgaris, juvenile diabetes, steroid-sensitive nephrotic syndrome, myasthenia gravis coeliac disease multiple sclerosis, chronic active hepatitis C, and Vogt–Koyanagi–Harada syndrome. However, it may predispose carriers to chronic infection such as leprosy, Helicobacter pylori-positive gastric lymphoma, and AIDS.

DQA1*0103:DQB1*0601 is part of a multigene haplotype (DRB1*1502:DRB5*0102:DQA1*0103:DQB1*0601:DPA1*02:DPB1*0901) linked to Takayasu's arteritis in Japanese. Another haplotype, DR8-DQ1 which contains this haplotype may be associated with primary biliary cirrhosis, Graves' disease There is a negative association of this DR15-DQ1 haplotype in Japanese with inflammatory bowel disease.

DQA1*0103:DQB1*0603 is part of a DR-DQ haplotype (DR13-DQ1) that increases for primary sclerosing cholangitis The same haplotype shows a negative association with rheumatic heart disease,

=== DQA1*0104 ===
DQA1*0104:DQB1*0503 is part of a multigene haplotype DR14-DQ5 that is associated with MuSK positive Myasthenia gravis.
