= Czerwiński CW 7 =

CW 7
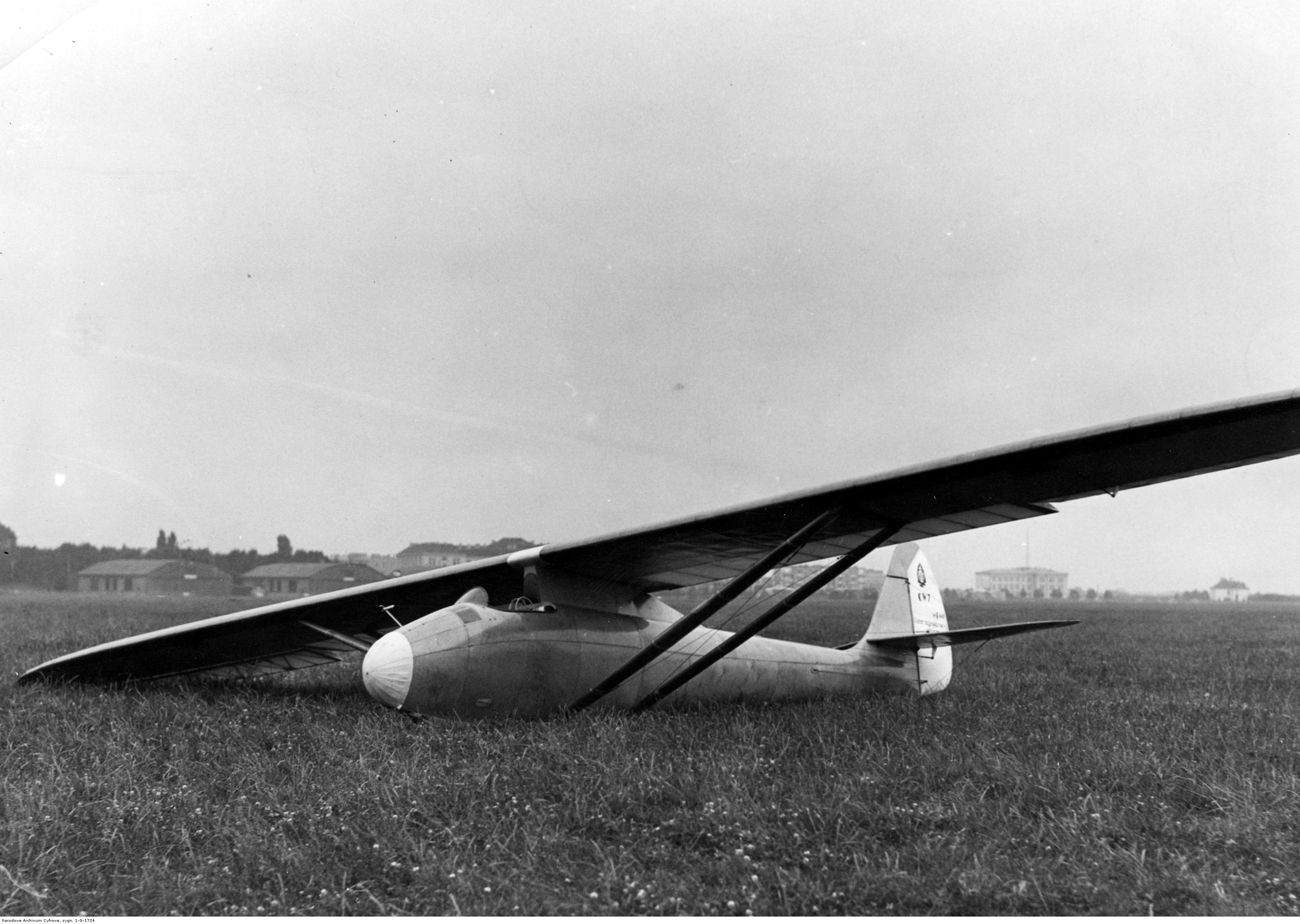

General information
- Type: Aerobatic glider
- National origin: Poland
- Manufacturer: ZASPL
- Designer: Wacław Czerwiński
- Number built: c.10

History
- First flight: 13 December 1934

The Czerwiński CW 7 was a Polish aerobatic glider first flown in 1934. Despite a structural weakness that prevented inverted flight, a small batch of CW 7s were used by several aeroclubs until the start of World War II.

== Design and development ==
In the mid-1930s interest in glider aerobatics was growing in Polish aeroclubs, leading to an official requirement for an aircraft specifically designed for the task. Two gliders resulted, the Sokól from Antoni Kocjan and Wacław Czerwiński's CW 7. The latter, like all but one of his earlier glider designs, was built in the workshops of ZASPL, the Aviation Association of Students of the Lwów Technical University.

The CW 7 was an all-wood aircraft with a high, two-part wing built around twin spars. In plan the wing was rectangular out to long semi-elliptical tips. It was braced with parallel pairs of airfoil-section struts from the lower fuselage to the spars. The upper surfaces were plywood covered to the rear spar across the whole span. Between the fuselage and the struts the lower wing surfaces were also ply covered to the rear spar but beyond the struts only to the forward spar. Elsewhere, top and bottom, the wing was fabric covered.

The fuselage was an oval section, ply-covered semi-monocoque with an open cockpit ahead of the wing leading edge. It tapered aft to the empennage which was wire-braced, with fixed surfaces covered with ply and control surfaces which were largely fabric covered apart from ply tips. The CW 7's small fin carried a full, rounded, balanced rudder; its tailplane was mounted near the base of the fin and had split elevators. The glider landed on a pneumatically sprung skid.

== Operational history ==
The first flight, under air towing, of the CW 7 was made in December 1934 at Lwów-Skniłów, piloted by Michal Blaicher. Encouraging flight trials, including full aerobatic programmes, showed good handling and manoeuvrability and led to an order from LOPP for about ten examples. In use several CW 7s experienced structural failures while performing aerobatics. These failures revealed a structural design weakness under the loads of inverted flight but, with a ban on any inverted manoeuvres, the glider remained in aerobatic use with various aeroclubs until the outbreak of World War II.

== Specifications ==
Data from Samolotypolskie.pl

General characteristics

- Crew: One
- Length: 6.8 m (22 ft 4 in)
- Wingspan: 13 m (42 ft 8 in)
- Height: 1.3 m (4 ft 3 in)
- Wing area: 16.0 m^{2} (172 sq ft)
- Aspect ratio: 10.3
- Empty weight: 140 kg (309 lb)
- Gross weight: 225 kg (496 lb)

Performance

- Maximum glide ratio: best 15.4 at 59 km/h (37 mph; 32 kn)
- Rate of sink: 0.97 m/s (191 ft/min) at 54 km/h (34 mph; 29 kn)
- Towing speed:141 km/h (88 mph; 76 kn)
- Minimum speed:54 km/h (34 mph; 29 kn)
