= HLA-Cw7 =

Part of the human genome

- (MHC Class I, C cell surface antigen)

About
- Protein: transmembrane receptor/ligand
- Structure: αβ heterodimer
- Subunits: HLA-Cw*07--, β_{2}-microglobulin
- Older names: -

Subtypes
Subtype	allele	Available structures
Cw7	*0701	
-	*0702	
{{{cNick3}}}	*07{{{cAllele3}}}	
{{{cNick4}}}	*07{{{cAllele4}}}	
- Alleles link-out to IMGT/HLA database at EBI

HLA-Cw7 (Cw7) is a human leukocyte antigen serotype within HLA-C serotype group. (For more general information on HLA serotypes, please see the article: History and naming of human leukocyte antigens.) Cw7 is determined by the antibody recognition of α^{7} subset of HLA-Cw α-chains. For the serotype Cw7, the alpha chain are encoded by the HLA-Cw*07 allele group and the β-chain are encoded by B2M locus. Cw7 and Cw*07 are almost synonymous in meaning. Cw7 is more common in West Africa to Ireland. Cw7 in Europe is part of the AH8.1 and HLA B7-DR15-DQ6 haplotypes. The class I region of these supertype is HLA A1-B8 haplotype, HLA A3-B7, HLA-A2-B7 and HLA A24-B7.

== Serotype ==
Cw7 recognition of some HLA Cw*07 gene products
Cw*07	Cw7	Sample
allele	%	size (N)
*0701	74	304
*0702	68	976

== Distribution ==
HLA Cw*0701 frequencies
- Study population: Freq. (in %)
- Cameroon Pygmy Baka: 25.0
- Ireland South: 21.2
- German Essen: 20.9
- Cameroon Sawa: 19.2
- Ireland Northern: 18.7
- France West: 18.1
- Kenya: 17.8
- Burkina Faso Fulani: 17.4
- Australia New South Wales: 17.3
- France South East: 17.3
- Morocco 'Berber' Nador Me…: 16.7
- Sudanese: 16.5
- United Kingdom Caucasians: 16.1
- Uganda Kampala: 16.0
- Brazil: 15.6
- USA Caucasian (2): 15.5
- Kenya Nandi: 15.2
- Pakistan Baloch: 15.2
- Burkina Faso Rimaibe: 14.9
- Finland: 14.4
- Czech Republic: 14.2
- Swiss Geneva: 13.6
- South Africa Natal Tamil: 13.5
- Cameroon Bamileke: 13.0
- India Khandesh Pawra: 13.0
- Cameroon Beti: 12.9
- Tunisia: 12.6
- India New Delhi: 12.5
- Saudi Arabia Guraiat and …: 12.3
- Turkey: 12.3
- Zambia Lusaka: 12.2
- Kenya Luo: 11.7
- Burkina Faso Mossi: 11.3
- South Korea (1): 11.1
- Spain Eastern Andalusia: 11.0
- USA Hispanic: 10.9
- Lebanon: 10.8
- India Tamil Nadu Nadar: 10.7
- Zimbabwe Harare Shona: 10.6
- Russia Arkhangelsk Pomors: 10.0
- Georgia Tbilisi Georgian…: 9.8
- Mexico Zaptotec Oaxaca: 9.7
- Israel Arab Druse: 9.0
- Senegal Niokholo Mandenka: 8.7
- USA North American Native…: 8.6
- Pakistan Sindhi: 8.3
- India North Delhi: 8.0
- Iran Baloch: 7.8
- Thailand: 7.7
- Singapore Riau Malay: 7.5
- India West Coast Parsis: 7.0
- Georgia Tbilisi Kurds: 6.9
- Pakistan Kalash: 6.5
- Mali Bandiagara: 6.2
- Pakistan Burusho: 5.6
- Pakistan Karachi Parsi: 5.5
- Pakistan Pathan: 5.5
- Russia Murmansk Saomi: 4.0
- Singapore Javanese Indone…: 4.0
- India Mumbai Marathas: 3.7
- Australia Indig. Cape Yor…: 3.4
- Pakistan Brahui: 3.4
- India West Bhils: 3.0
- China North Han: 2.9
- Jordan Amman: 2.8
- China Inner Mongolia: 2.5
- Italy North Pavia: 2.5
- Russia Nenets: 2.4
- China Qinghai Hui: 2.3
- Australia Indig. Groote E…: 2.1
- Russia Tuva (2): 2.0
- USA Hawaii Okinawa: 1.9
- USA Asian: 1.8
- China South Han: 1.6
- China Beijing: 1.5
- Papua New Guinea Wanigela: 1.4

HLA Cw*0702 frequencies
- Study population: Freq. (in %)
- Venezuela Sierra de Perij…: 71.4
- PNG New Britain Rabaul: 57.1
- Mexico Mixtec Oaxaca: 33.3
- China Yunnan Lisu: 32.9
- Taiwan Taroko: 31.8
- China Yunnan Nu: 30.7
- Venezuela Perja Mountain …: 30.3
- PNG Madang: 30.2
- Mexico Zaptotec Oaxaca: 28.4
- Taiwan Tsou: 27.5
- Mexico Mixe Oaxaca: 26.4
- Russia Arkhangelsk Pomors: 26.0
- Ch. Guangdong Meizhou H…: 25.8
- Pakistan Burusho: 25.5
- USA South Dakota Lakota S…: 24.4
- Russia Nenets: 23.8
- USA New Mexico Canoncito …: 23.2
- China South Han: 20.8
- Brazil Terena: 20.2
- China Guangzhou: 19.9
- USA Asian: 19.5
- Ireland Northern: 18.6
- Swiss Geneva: 18.2
- Taiwan Bunun: 17.8
- Ireland South: 17.4
- Singapore Javanese Indone…: 17.0
- Philippines Ivatan: 16.0
- Taiwan Rukai: 16.0
- Australia New South Wales: 15.8
- Finland: 15.6
- USA South Texas Hispanics: 15.6
- Pakistan Sindhi: 15.5
- United Kingdom Caucasians: 15.5
- Saudi Arabia Guraiat and …: 15.2
- Cameroon Pygmy Baka: 15.0
- India Tamil Nadu Nadar: 14.8
- Japan Central: 14.6
- Russia Murmansk Saomi: 14.0
- USA Hawaii Okinawa: 13.8
- China Beijing: 13.6
- China Tibetan: 13.3
- China Qinghai Hui: 13.2
- Thailand: 13.0
- USA North American Native…: 12.8
- China Inner Mongolia: 12.7
- Japan (3): 12.7
- Pakistan Brahui: 12.5
- PNG Wanigela: 12.5
- USA Caucasian pop2: 12.5
- USA Hispanic: 12.4
- Czech Republic: 12.3
- China North Han: 11.9
- Taiwan Paiwan: 11.8
- China Wuhan: 11.6
- Cameroon Sawa: 11.5
- Taiwan Siraya: 10.8
- Taiwan Ami: 10.7
- New Caledonia: 10.0
- India North Delhi: 9.9
- Australia Indig. Cape Yor…: 9.6
- Pakistan Pathan: 9.5
- France West: 9.4
- Iran Baloch: 9.4
- South Africa Natal Tamil: 9.4
- German Essen: 9.1
- Taiwan Puyuma: 9.0
- India New Delhi: 8.9
- Pakistan Kalash: 8.7
- India Mumbai Marathas: 8.6
- Russia Tuva pop 2: 8.6
- South Korea (3): 8.3
- American Samoa: 8.0
- Brazil: 8.0
- USA African American: 8.0
- France South East: 7.2
- Cameroon Bamileke: 7.1
- India West Bhils: 7.0
- Australia Indig. Yuendumu: 6.8
- Cameroon Beti: 6.6
- Georgia Tbilisi Georgian…: 6.5
- Uganda Kampala: 6.1
- Turkey: 6.0
- Spain Eastern Andalusia: 5.5
- PNG Wosera: 5.4
- Mali Bandiagara: 4.7
- Zimbabwe Harare Shona: 4.6
- Mexico Chihuahua State Ta…: 4.5
- Pakistan Baloch: 4.5
- Kenya: 4.4
- Zambia Lusaka: 4.4
- Lebanon: 4.1
- Israel Arab Druse: 4.0
- Kenya Luo: 3.8
- Tunisia: 3.6
- PNG Eastern Highlands Gor…: 3.5
- Sudanese: 3.5
- Georgia Tbilisi Kurds: 3.4
- Morocco 'Berber' Nador Me…: 3.2
- England London Ashkenazi …: 2.9
