= HLA-DQB1 =

Protein-coding gene in the species Homo sapiens

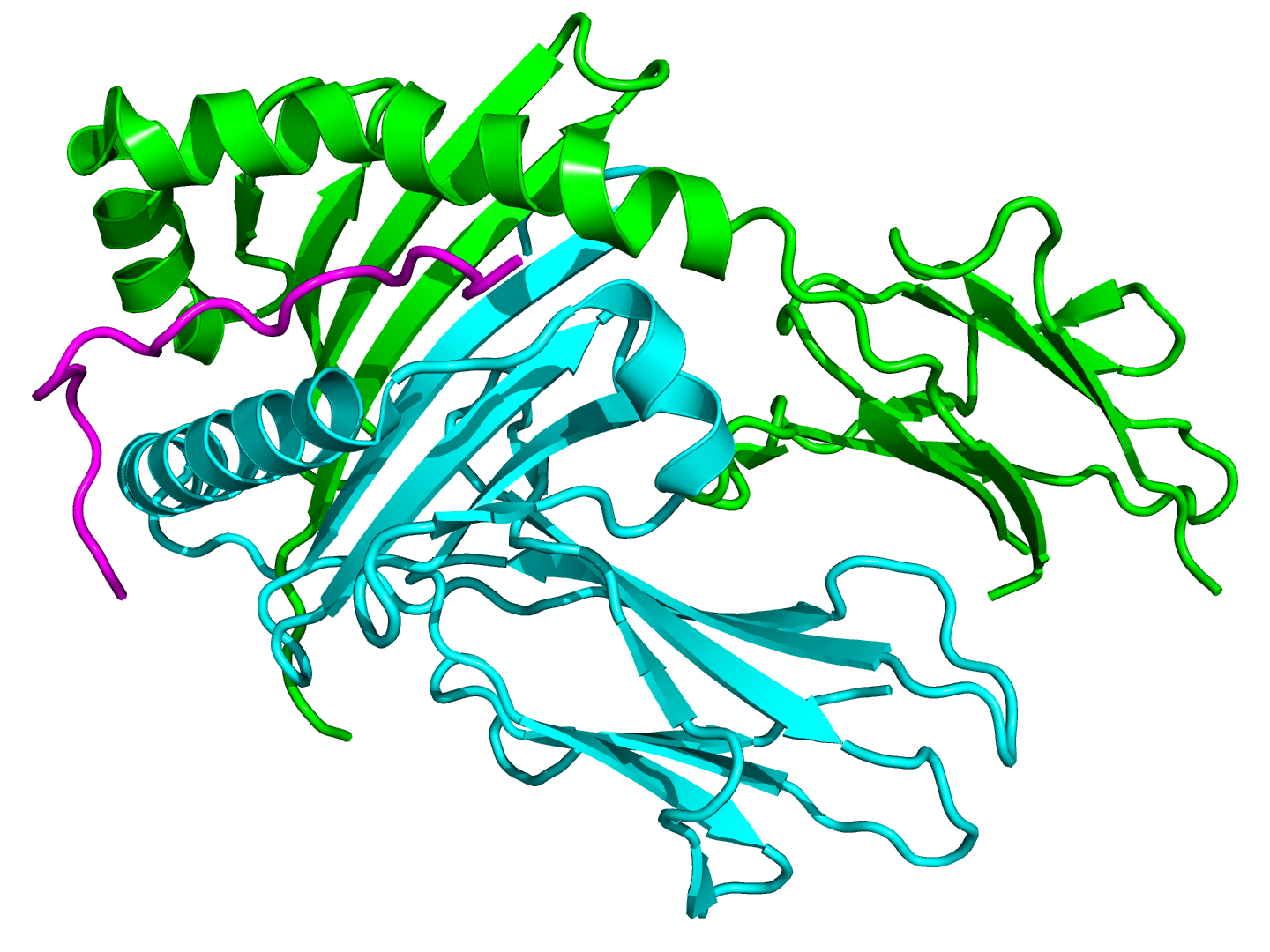

Identifiers
- Aliases: HLA-DQB1, CELIAC1, HLA-DQB, IDDM1, major histocompatibility complex, class II, DQ beta 1, HLA-DRB1
- External IDs: OMIM: 604305; MGI: 103070; GeneCards: HLA-DQB1
Available structures
PDB	Ortholog search: PDBe RCSB
PDB	List of PDB id codes 1JK8, 1S9V, 1UVQ, 2NNA, 4GG6

Gene location (Human)
Chr.	Chromosome 6 (human)
Band	6p21.32	Start	32,659,467 bp
Band	6p21.32	End	32,668,383 bp

Gene location (Mouse)
Chr.	Chromosome 17 (mouse)
Band	17 B1|17 17.98 cM	Start	34,476,663 bp
Band	17 B1|17 17.98 cM	End	34,488,393 bp
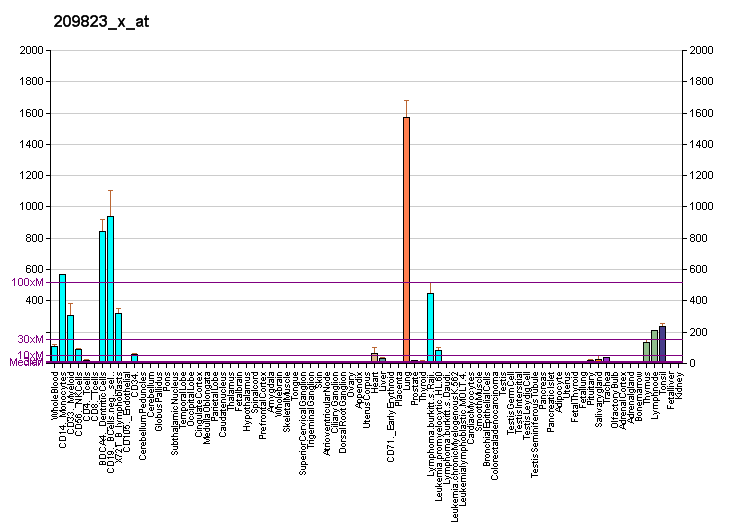
RNA expression pattern
Bgee	Human / Mouse (ortholog); Top expressed in: right lung; spleen; upper lobe of left lung; gallbladder; lymph node; monocyte; granulocyte; right coronary artery; rectum; visceral pleura / Top expressed in: mesenteric lymph nodes; spleen; thymus; submandibular gland; skin of external ear; right lung lobe; lip; white adipose tissue; right kidney; subcutaneous adipose tissue; More reference expression data
BioGPS	More reference expression data
Gene ontology
Molecular function	peptide antigen binding; MHC class II receptor activity; protein binding
Cellular component	integral component of membrane; endocytic vesicle membrane; clathrin-coated endocytic vesicle membrane; endosome; Golgi apparatus; trans-Golgi network membrane; endoplasmic reticulum membrane; membrane; Golgi membrane; plasma membrane; transport vesicle membrane; MHC class II protein complex; lysosomal membrane; endoplasmic reticulum; ER to Golgi transport vesicle membrane; lysosome; integral component of lumenal side of endoplasmic reticulum membrane; endosome membrane
Biological process	antigen processing and presentation; antigen processing and presentation of exogenous peptide antigen via MHC class II; interferon-gamma-mediated signaling pathway; immunoglobulin production involved in immunoglobulin-mediated immune response; immune system process; T cell costimulation; antigen processing and presentation of peptide or polysaccharide antigen via MHC class II; humoral immune response mediated by circulating immunoglobulin; immune response; T cell receptor signaling pathway; adaptive immune response
Sources:Amigo / QuickGO
Orthologs
Databases	NCBI: entry; OMA: entry
Species	Human	Mouse
Entrez	3119	14961
Ensembl	ENSG00000233209; ENSG00000206237; ENSG00000231286; ENSG00000206302; ENSG00000179344 ENSG00000231939; ENSG00000225824	ENSMUSG00000073421
UniProt	P01920	P14483; P01921; P06342; P06343; P06345 P06346
RefSeq (mRNA)	NM_002123; NM_001243961; NM_001243962	NM_207105
RefSeq (protein)	NP_001230890; NP_001230891; NP_002114	NP_996988
Location (UCSC)	Chr 6: 32.66 – 32.67 Mb	Chr 17: 34.48 – 34.49 Mb
PubMed search
- Wikidata
View/Edit Human	View/Edit Mouse

Major histocompatibility complex, class II, DQ beta 1, also known as HLA-DQB1, is a human gene and also denotes the genetic locus that contains this gene. The protein encoded by this gene is one of two proteins that are required to form the DQ heterodimer, a cell surface receptor essential to the function of the immune system.

== Function ==
HLA-DQB1 belongs to the HLA class II beta chain paralogues. This class II molecule is a heterodimer consisting of an alpha (DQA) and a beta chain (DQB), both anchored in the membrane. It plays a central role in the immune system by presenting peptides derived from extracellular proteins. Class II molecules are expressed in antigen-presenting cells (APC: B lymphocytes, dendritic cells, macrophages).

== Gene structure and polymorphisms ==
The beta chain is approximately 26-28 kDa and it contains 6 exons. Exon one encodes the leader peptide, exons 2 and 3 encode the two extracellular protein domains, exon 4 encodes the transmembrane domain, and exon 5 encodes the cytoplasmic tail. Within the DQ molecule, both the alpha chain and the beta chain contain the polymorphisms specifying the peptide binding specificities, resulting in up to 4 different molecules. Typing for these polymorphisms is routinely done for bone marrow transplantation.

== Disease association ==
=== Autism ===
A four-loci genotype study showed that A*01-B*07-DRB1*0701- DQB1*0602 (P = 0.001, OR 41.9) and the A*31-B*51-DRB1*0103- DQB1*0302 (P = 0.012, OR 4.8) are positively associated with autism among Saudi patients.

=== Diabetes ===
Several alleles of HLA-DQB1 are associated with an increased risk of developing type 1 diabetes. The locus also has the genetic name IDDM1 as it is the highest genetic risk for type 1 diabetes. Again the DQB1*0201 and DQB1*0302 alleles, particularly the phenotype DQB1*0201/*0302 has a high risk of late onset type 1 diabetes. The risk is partially shared with the HLA-DR locus (DR3 and DR4 serotypes).

=== Celiac disease ===
Celiac1 is a genetic name for DQB1, the HLA DQB1*0201, *0202, and *0302 encode genes that mediate the autoimmune coeliac disease. Homozygotes of DQB1*0201 have a higher risk of developing the celiac disease, relative to any other genetic locus.

=== Multiple sclerosis ===
Certain HLA-DQB1 alleles are also linked to a modest increased risk of multiple sclerosis.

=== Narcolepsy ===
Other HLA-DQB1 alleles are associated with a predisposition to narcolepsy, specifically HLA-DQB1*0602, which is carried by over 90% of patients with type 1 narcolepsy.

== Alleles ==
HLA-DQB1 alleles
Serotype	DQB1 allele
DQ2	*0201
DQ2	*0202
DQ2	*0203
DQ4	*0401
DQ4	*0402
DQ5	*0501
DQ5	*0502
DQ5	*0503
DQ5	*0504
DQ6	*0601
DQ6	*0602
DQ6	*0603
DQ6	*0604
DQ6	*0605
DQ6	*0609
DQ7	*0301
DQ7	*0304
DQ8	*0302
DQ8	*0305
DQ9	*0303

== See also ==
- Major histocompatibility complex
- Human leukocyte antigen
- HLA-DQ
