= Tenascin-R =

Protein found in hmans

TNR
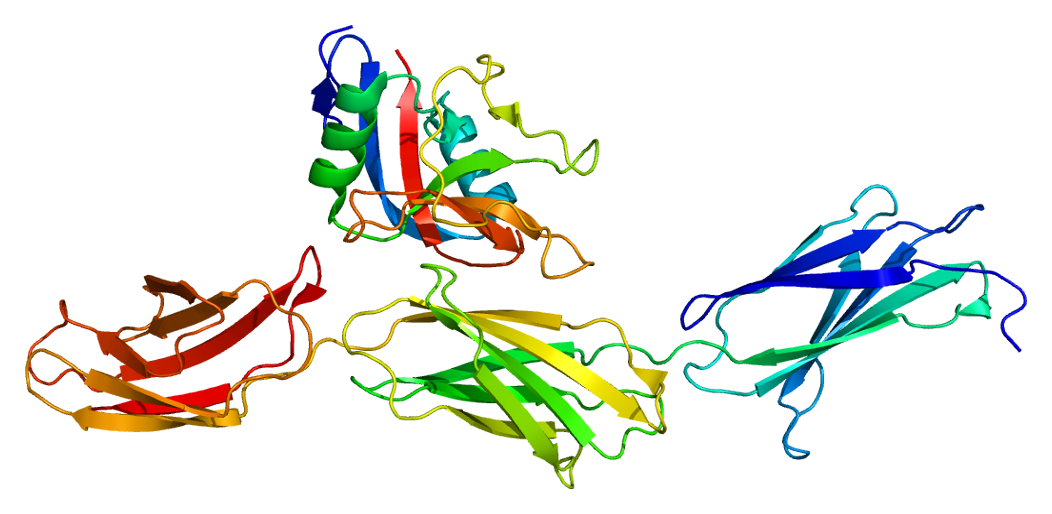

Identifiers
- Aliases: TNR, TN-R, tenascin R, NEDSTO
- External IDs: OMIM: 601995; MGI: 99516; GeneCards: TNR

Gene location (Human)
Chr.	Chromosome 1 (human)
Band	1q25.1	Start	175,315,194 bp
Band	1q25.1	End	175,743,616 bp

Gene location (Mouse)
Chr.	Chromosome 1 (mouse)
Band	1|1 H1	Start	159,351,339 bp
Band	1|1 H1	End	159,759,299 bp
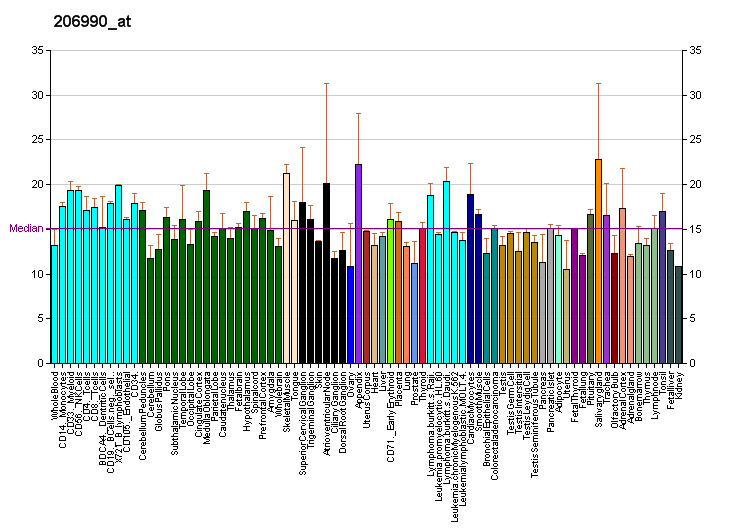
RNA expression pattern
Bgee	Human / Mouse (ortholog); Top expressed in: Region I of hippocampus proper; entorhinal cortex; inferior ganglion of vagus nerve; medulla oblongata; subthalamic nucleus; superior vestibular nucleus; ventral tegmental area; postcentral gyrus; inferior olivary nucleus; pars reticulata / Top expressed in: dentate gyrus of hippocampal formation granule cell; lumbar subsegment of spinal cord; primary visual cortex; superior frontal gyrus; ciliary body; iris; facial motor nucleus; neural layer of retina; hippocampus proper; anterior horn of spinal cord; More reference expression data
BioGPS	More reference expression data
Gene ontology
Molecular function	protein binding
Cellular component	extracellular region; cell surface; membrane raft; perineuronal net; collagen-containing extracellular matrix; extracellular matrix; Schaffer collateral - CA1 synapse; glutamatergic synapse
Biological process	negative regulation of neuron projection development; positive regulation of synaptic transmission, glutamatergic; extracellular matrix organization; axon guidance; synapse organization; positive regulation of transmission of nerve impulse; neuron cell-cell adhesion; negative regulation of cell-cell adhesion; telencephalon cell migration; negative regulation of axon extension; locomotory exploration behavior; long-term potentiation; neuromuscular process controlling balance; regulation of neurogenesis; negative regulation of axon extension involved in regeneration; negative regulation of synaptic transmission; modulation of chemical synaptic transmission; associative learning; cell adhesion
Sources:Amigo / QuickGO
Orthologs
Databases	NCBI: entry; OMA: entry
Species	Human	Mouse
Entrez	7143	21960
Ensembl	ENSG00000116147	ENSMUSG00000015829
UniProt	Q92752	Q8BYI9
RefSeq (mRNA)	NM_003285; NM_001328635	NM_022312
RefSeq (protein)	NP_001315564; NP_003276; NP_003276.3	NP_071707
Location (UCSC)	Chr 1: 175.32 – 175.74 Mb	Chr 1: 159.35 – 159.76 Mb
PubMed search
- Wikidata
View/Edit Human	View/Edit Mouse

Tenascin-R is a protein that in humans is encoded by the TNR gene.

== Function ==
Tenascin-R (TNR) is an extracellular matrix protein expressed primarily in the central nervous system. It is a member of the tenascin (TN) gene family, which includes 4 genes in mammals: TNC (or hexabrachion), TNX (TNXB), TNW (also known as TNN) and TNR. The genes are expressed in distinct tissues at different times during embryonic development and are present in adult tissues.[supplied by OMIM]
