= Winged helix repair factor 1 =

Protein-coding gene in humans

WHR1

Identifiers
- Aliases: WHR1, D6S60, D6S60E, G11, HLA-RP1, RP1, serine/threonine kinase 19, STK19, winged helix repair factor 1
- External IDs: OMIM: 604977; MGI: 1860085; GeneCards: WHR1

Gene location (Human)
Chr.	Chromosome 6 (human)
Band	6p21.33	Start	31,971,091 bp
Band	6p21.33	End	31,982,821 bp

Gene location (Mouse)
Chr.	Chromosome 17 (mouse)
Band	17|17 B1	Start	35,042,969 bp
Band	17|17 B1	End	35,055,921 bp
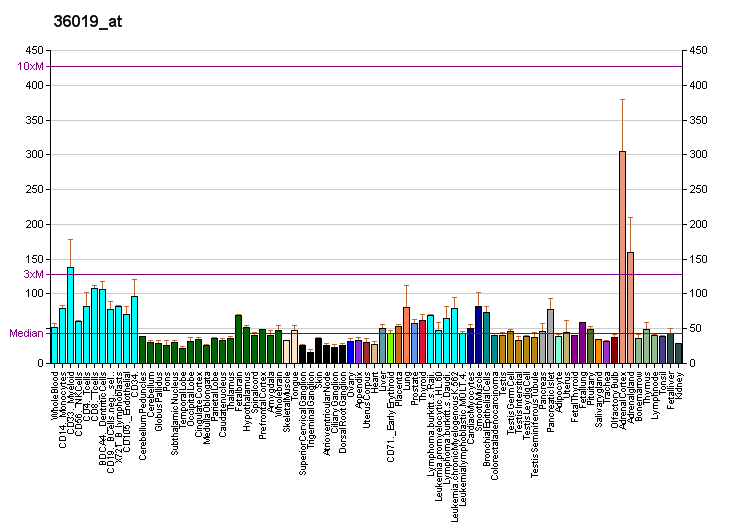

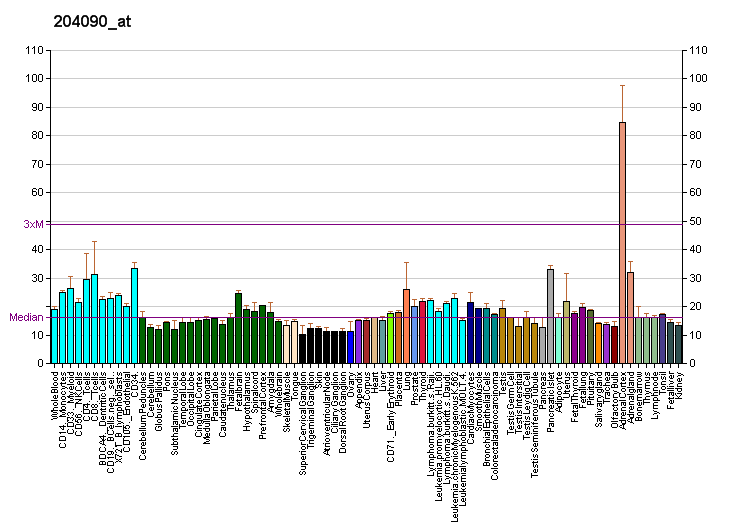
RNA expression pattern
Bgee	Human / Mouse (ortholog); Top expressed in: left adrenal gland; left adrenal cortex; right adrenal gland; right adrenal cortex; right lobe of liver; skin of leg; anterior pituitary; skin of abdomen; left ovary; right ovary / Top expressed in: bone marrow; lip; superior frontal gyrus; islet of Langerhans; duodenum; jejunum; primary visual cortex; proximal tubule; adrenal gland; granulocyte; More reference expression data
BioGPS	More reference expression data
Gene ontology
Molecular function	transferase activity; nucleotide binding; protein serine/threonine kinase activity; ATP binding; kinase activity; protein binding
Cellular component	nucleus; nuclear speck
Biological process	protein phosphorylation; phosphorylation
Sources:Amigo / QuickGO
Orthologs
Databases	NCBI: entry; OMA: entry
Species	Human	Mouse
Entrez	8859	54402
Ensembl	ENSG00000226257; ENSG00000206342; ENSG00000236250; ENSG00000226033; ENSG00000204344 ENSG00000234947	ENSMUSG00000061207
UniProt	P49842	Q9JHN8
RefSeq (mRNA)	NM_004197; NM_032454	NM_019442
RefSeq (protein)	NP_004188; NP_115830	NP_062315
Location (UCSC)	Chr 6: 31.97 – 31.98 Mb	Chr 17: 35.04 – 35.06 Mb
PubMed search
- Wikidata
View/Edit Human	View/Edit Mouse

Winged helix repair factor 1 is a protein that in humans is encoded by the WHR1 gene (previously STK19) and is involved in DNA repair, specifically the transcription-coupled nucleotide excision repair (TC-NER) pathway.

It used to be called "serine/threonine kinase 19", but this was misleading — although WHR1 was initially identified as a serine/threonine kinase, analysis of the crystal structure revealed absence of the kinase domain and it does not seem to possess any kinase activity.

This gene localizes to the major histocompatibility complex (MHC) class III region on chromosome 6 and expresses two transcript variants.

== Structure ==
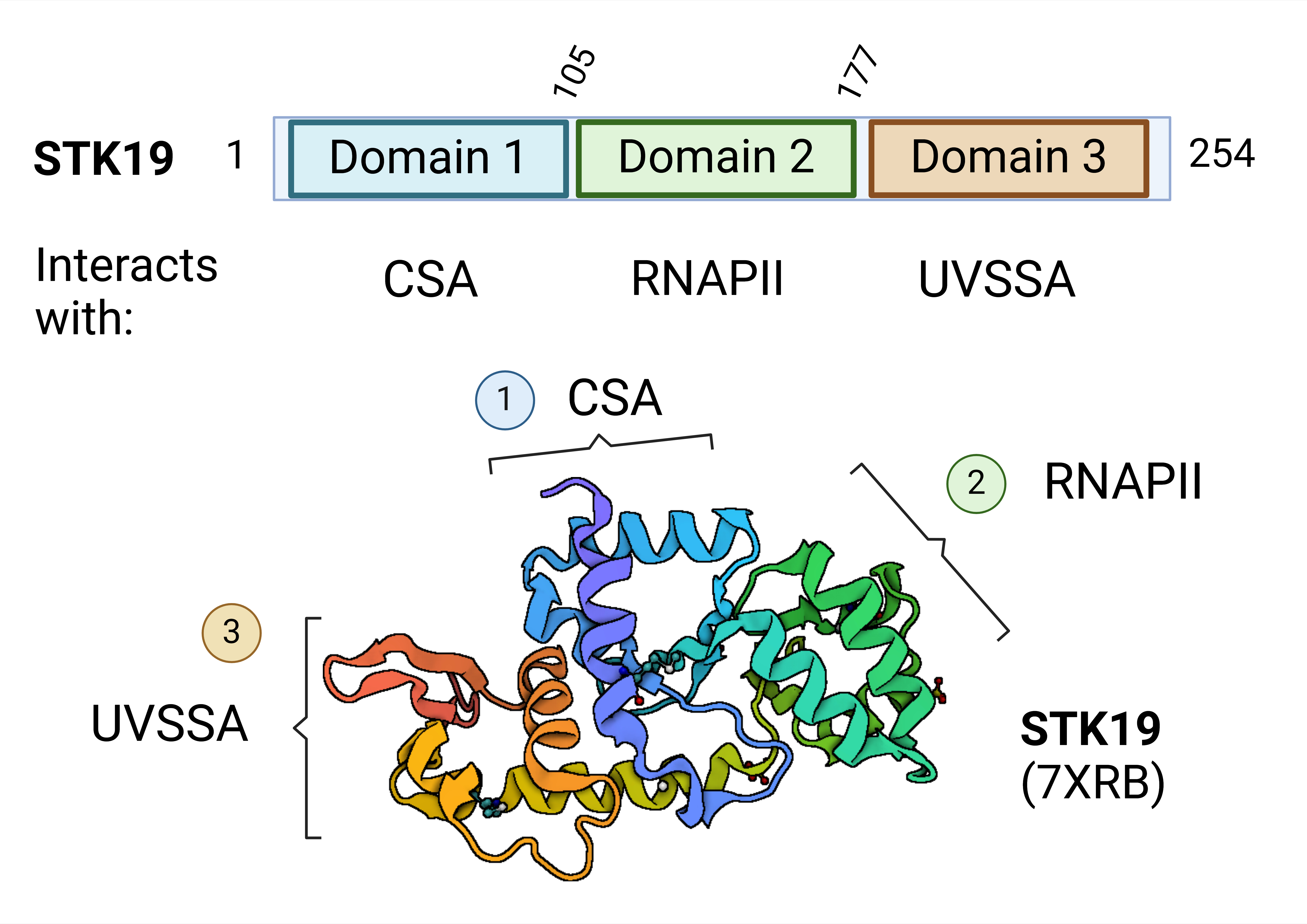
Structure of WHR1 showing the CSA, RNAPII, and UVSSA interacting domains. Based on figure and domain identification by Heuvel, et al., with accompanying protein structure (PDB: 7XRB).

WHR1 contains 3 different protein-interaction domains, which are essential to its function in DNA repair: the CSA interacting domain, RNA polymerase II (RNAPII) interacting domain, and UVSSA interacting domain. These domains allow WHR1 to incorporate into the Transcription-Coupled DNA Repair (TCR) complex, which is recruited to RNA Polymerase II stalled at DNA lesions.

Part of the UVSAA binding domain may also interact with XPD, a protein in the TFIIH (transcription factor IIH) complex. This complex is recruited to the TCR and is involved in excising the damaged DNA. WHR1 binding to XPD is theorized to help optimally position the TFIIH ATPase subunits XPD and XPB onto the DNA in front of the lesion.

== Role in transcription coupled nucleotide excision repair ==
WHR1 is involved in transcription-coupled nucleotide excision repair (TC-NER), a DNA repair pathway that preferentially detects and removes DNA damage in portions of the genome that are being actively transcribed (copied from DNA into RNA). By contrast, the non-transcribed strand and portions of the genome not under active transcription are repaired more slowly, using global genome nucleotide excision repair (GG-NER).

== See also ==
- RCCX
