= 21-Hydroxylase =

Human enzyme that hydroxylates steroids

Steroid 21-hydroxylase
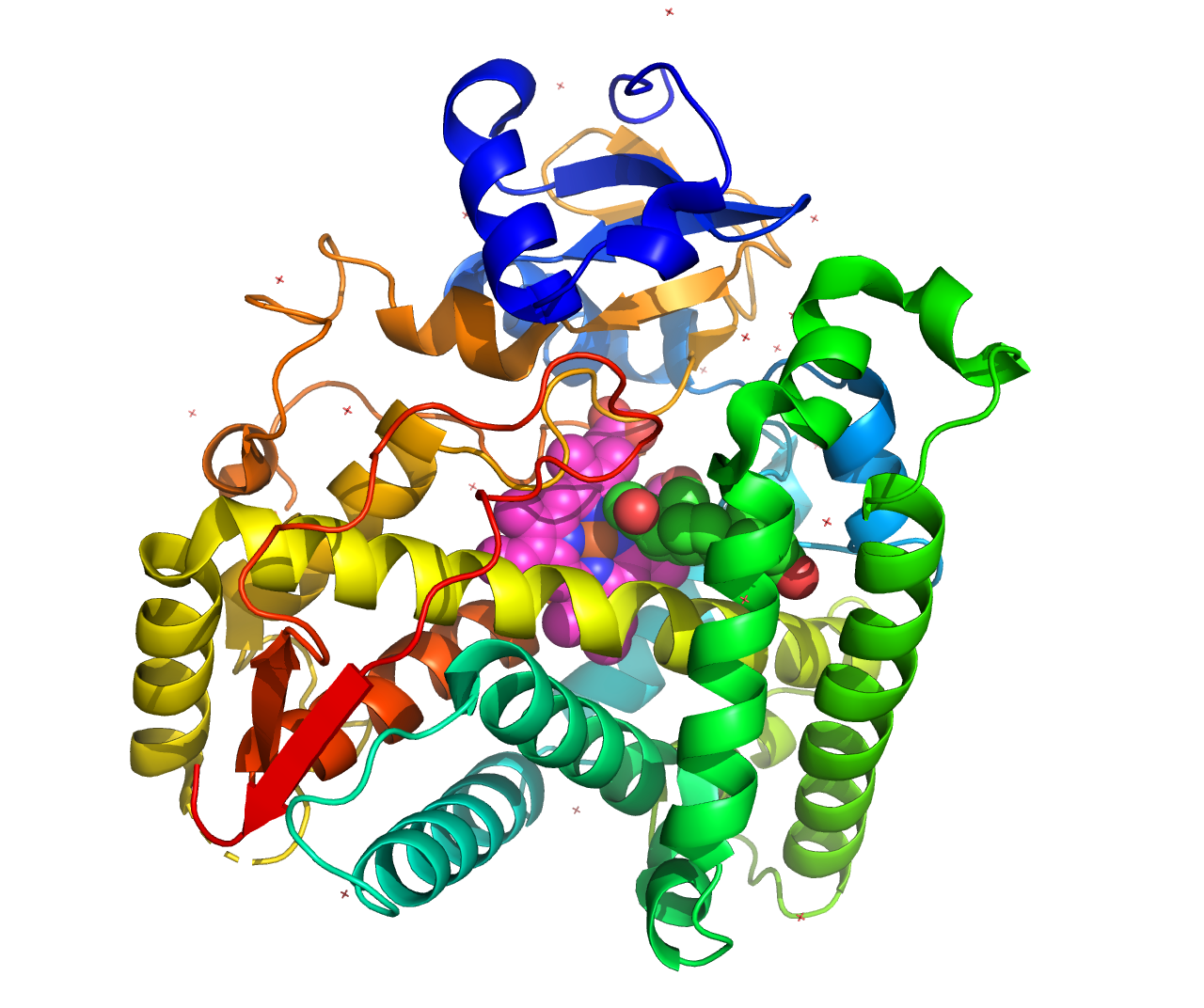

Identifiers
- EC no.: 1.14.14.16
- CAS no.: 9029-68-9
- Alt. names: "Cytochrome P450, family 21, subfamily A, polypeptide 2", CYP21A2, CYP21, CYP21B, P45021A2, cytochrome P450c21, steroid 21-monooxygenase, 21-hydroxylase, 21α-hydroxylase, 21β-hydroxylase

Databases
- BRENDA: enzyme data
- ExPASy: NiceZyme view
- KEGG: enzyme entry
- MetaCyc: metabolic pathway
- Rhea: reactions
- PDB structures: RCSB PDB PDBe PDBsum
- Gene Ontology: AmiGO / QuickGO
Search
- PMC: articles
- PubMed: articles
- NCBI: proteins

Steroid 21-hydroxylase is an enzyme encoded by the CYP21A2 gene in human. This enzyme hydroxylates steroids at the C21 position on the molecule. Naming conventions for enzymes are based on the substrate acted upon and the chemical process performed. Biochemically, this enzyme is involved in the biosynthesis of the adrenal gland hormones aldosterone and cortisol, which are important in blood pressure regulation, sodium homeostasis and blood sugar control. The enzyme converts progesterone and 17α-hydroxyprogesterone into 11-deoxycorticosterone and 11-deoxycortisol, respectively, within metabolic pathways which in humans ultimately lead to aldosterone and cortisol creation—deficiency in the enzyme may cause congenital adrenal hyperplasia.

Steroid 21-hydroxylase is a member of the cytochrome P450 family of monooxygenase enzymes that use an iron-containing heme cofactor to oxidize substrates.

In humans, the enzyme is localized in endoplasmic reticulum membranes of cells in adrenal cortex, and is encoded by the CYP21A2 gene which is located near the CYP21A1P pseudogene that has high degree of sequence similarity. This similarity makes it difficult to analyze the gene at the molecular level, and sometimes leads to loss-of-function mutations of the gene due to intergenic exchange of DNA.

== Gene ==
CYP21A2
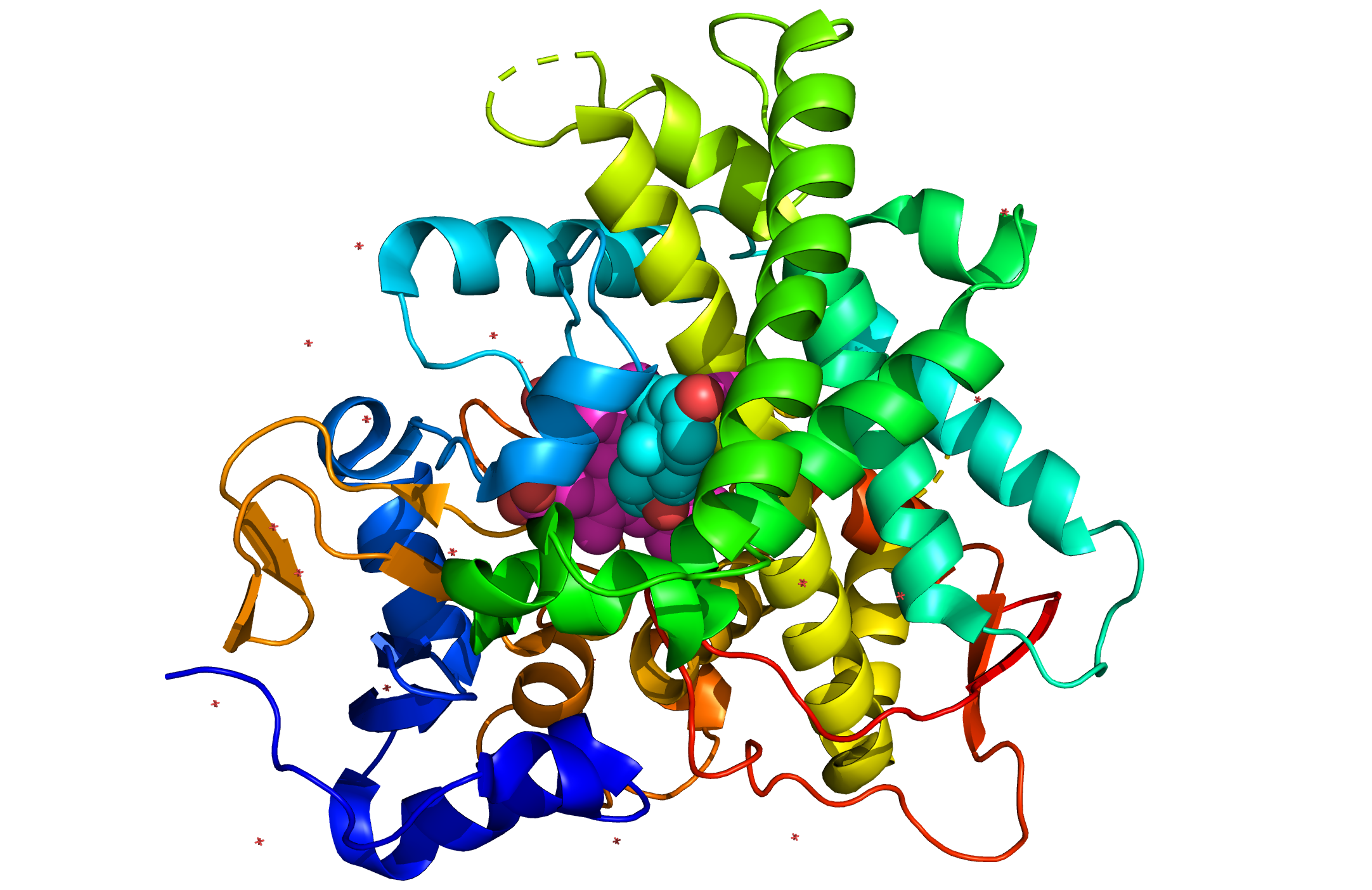

Identifiers
- Aliases: CYP21A2, CA21H, CAH1, CPS1, CYP21, CYP21B, P450c21B, cytochrome P450 family 21 subfamily A member 2
- External IDs: OMIM: 613815; MGI: 88591; GeneCards: CYP21A2
Available structures
PDB	Ortholog search: PDBe RCSB
PDB	List of PDB id codes 4Y8W,%%s2GEG
Enzyme activity
EC #	BRENDA	ExPASy	KEGG	MetaCyc
1.14.14.16	↗	↗	↗	↗
1.14.14.16	↗	↗	↗	↗

Gene location (Human)
Chr.	Chromosome 6 (human)
Band	6p21.33	Start	32,038,265 bp
Band	6p21.33	End	32,041,670 bp

Gene location (Mouse)
Chr.	Chromosome 17 (mouse)
Band	17 B1|17 18.36 cM	Start	35,020,322 bp
Band	17 B1|17 18.36 cM	End	35,023,535 bp
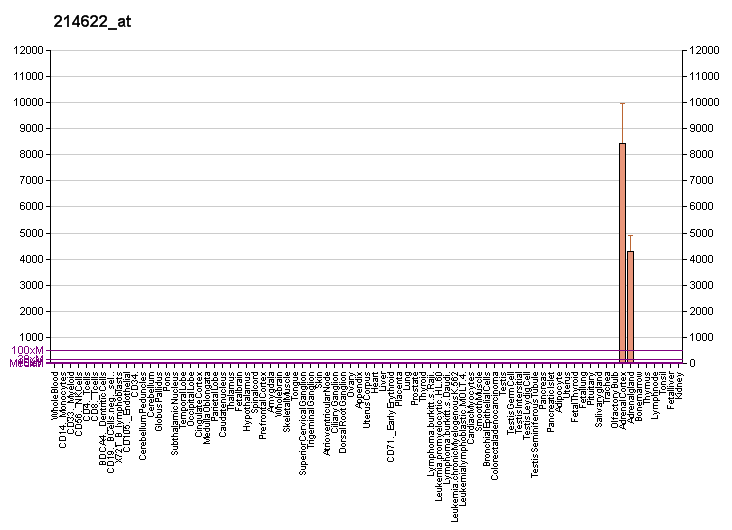
RNA expression pattern
Bgee	Human / Mouse (ortholog); Top expressed in: right adrenal gland; left adrenal gland; right adrenal cortex; left adrenal cortex; right lobe of liver; testicle; left ovary; spleen; right ovary; gastric mucosa / Top expressed in: adrenal gland; spermatid; spermatocyte; Gonadal ridge; gastrula; muscle of thigh; cervix; hepatobiliary system; liver; spleen; More reference expression data
BioGPS	More reference expression data
Gene ontology
Molecular function	iron ion binding; metal ion binding; monooxygenase activity; steroid hydroxylase activity; steroid binding; heme binding; oxidoreductase activity, acting on paired donors, with incorporation or reduction of molecular oxygen; oxidoreductase activity; lipid binding; steroid 21-monooxygenase activity
Cellular component	organelle membrane; endoplasmic reticulum membrane; membrane; intracellular membrane-bounded organelle; endoplasmic reticulum
Biological process	glucocorticoid biosynthetic process; mineralocorticoid biosynthetic process; sterol metabolic process; steroid biosynthetic process; steroid metabolic process
Sources:Amigo / QuickGO
Orthologs
Databases	NCBI: entry; OMA: entry
Species	Human	Mouse
Entrez	1589	13079
Ensembl	ENSG00000198457; ENSG00000231852; ENSG00000206338; ENSG00000233151; ENSG00000232414 ENSG00000235134	ENSMUSG00000024365
UniProt	P08686; Q08AG9	P03940
RefSeq (mRNA)	NM_000500; NM_001128590	NM_009995
RefSeq (protein)	NP_000491; NP_001122062; NP_001355072; NP_001355073; NP_000491.4 NP_001122062.3	NP_034125
Location (UCSC)	Chr 6: 32.04 – 32.04 Mb	Chr 17: 35.02 – 35.02 Mb
PubMed search
- Wikidata
View/Edit Human	View/Edit Mouse

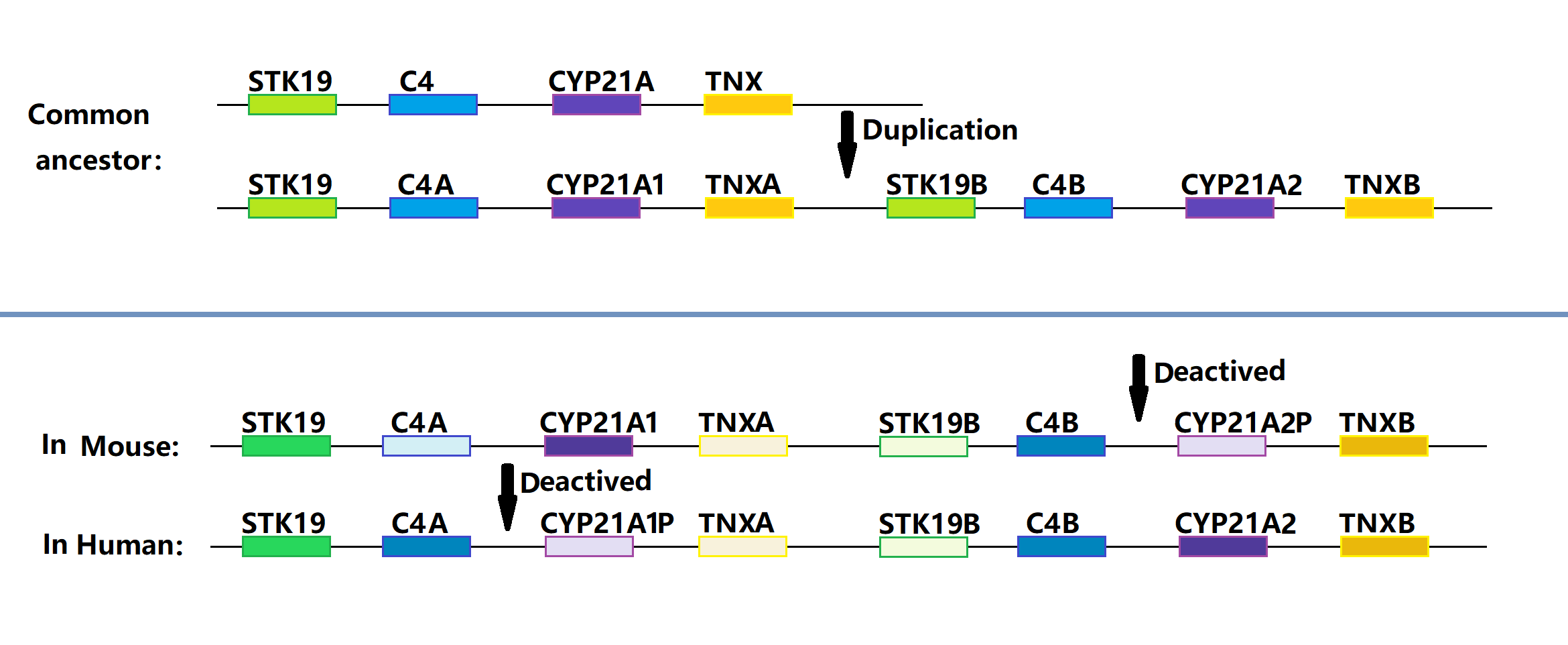
Evolution of the CYP21A locus in humans and mice.

Steroid 21-hydroxylase in humans is encoded by the CYP21A2 gene that may be accompanied by one or several copies of the nonfunctional pseudogene CYP21A1P, this pseudogene shares 98% of the exonic informational identity with the actual functional gene.

Pseudogenes are common in genomes, and they originate as artifacts during the duplication process. Though often thought of as "junk DNA", research has shown that retaining these faulty copies can have a beneficial role, often providing regulation of their parent genes.

In the mouse genome, the Cyp21a2 is a pseudogene and the Cyp21a1 is a functional gene. In the chicken and quail, there is only a single Cyp21 gene, which locus is located between complement component C4 and TNX gene, along with Cenpa.

CYP21A2 in humans is located in chromosome 6, in the major histocompatibility complex III (MHC class III) close to the Complement component 4 genes C4A and C4B, the Tenascin X gene TNXB and WHR1. MHC class III is the most gene-dense region of the human genome, containing many genes that have, as of 2023 - unknown functions or structures.

Inside the MHC class III, CYP21A2 is located within the RCCX cluster (an abbreviation composed of the names of the genes RP (a former name for WHR1 Winged helix repair factor 1), C4, CYP21 and TNX), which is the most complex gene cluster in the human genome. The number of RCCX segments varies between one and four in a chromosome, with the prevalence of approximately 15% for monomodular, 75% for bimodular (STK19-C4A-CYP21A1P-TNXA-STK19B-C4B-CYP21A2-TNXB), and 10% for trimodular in Europeans. The quadrimodular structure of the RCCX unit is very rare. In a monomodular structure, all of the genes are functional i.e. protein-coding, but if a module count is two or more, there is only one copy of each functional gene rest being non-coding pseudogenes with the exception of the C4 gene which always has active copies.

Due to the high degree of homology between the CYP21A2 gene and the CYP21A1P pseudogene and the complexity of the RCCX locus, it is difficult to perform molecular diagnostics for CYP21A2. The pseudogene can have single-nucleotide polymorphisms (SNP) that are identical or similar to those in the functional gene, making it difficult to distinguish between them. The pseudogene can also recombine with the functional gene, creating hybrid genes that have features of both. This recombination can result in false-positive or false-negative results when testing for SNPs in the CYP21A2.

The whole genome sequencing technology relies on breaking the DNA into small fragments, sequencing them, and then assembling them back together based on their overlaps. However, because of the high homology and variability of the CYP21A2 and its pseudogene, the fragments cannot be mapped unambiguously to either copy of the gene. Such ambiguity can lead to errors or gaps in the assembly, or missing some variants that are present in the gene.

Polymerase chain reaction (PCR) molecular diagnostics uses selective primers to amplify specific segments of the DNA sequence that are relevant for diagnosing or detecting a certain disease or condition. If the primers are not designed carefully, they may bind to both the CYP21A2 and the CYP21A1P pseudogene, or to different segments of the RCCX cluster, resulting in false-positive or false-negative results. Therefore, PCR for the CYP21A2 requires the use of locus-specific primers that can distinguish between the gene and the pseudogene, and between different RCCX modules. Moreover, PCR may not be able to detect complex variants such as large gene conversions, deletions, or duplications, which are frequent in the case of the CYP21A2.

Southern blotting, a method used for detecting and quantifying a specific DNA sequence in DNA samples, also has limitations in analyzing CYP21A2. This method is time-consuming and requires a large amount of good-quality DNA, which makes it less applicable in routine diagnostic settings. This method comes with a radioactive biohazard, which poses safety concerns and makes it labor-intensive. Southern blotting is unable to detect the junction sites of chimeras. The CYP21A2 gene is prone to mismatch and rearrangement, producing different types of complex variations that include copy number variants, large gene conversions, small insertions/deletions, and single-nucleotide (SNP) variants. Southern blotting is not capable of detecting all these types of variants simultaneously. Besides that, southern blotting requires genetic analysis of the parents, which is not always feasible or practical.

Therefore, to analyze the CYP21A2 gene accurately, a more specialized and sensitive method is needed, such as targeted long-read sequencing, which can sequence longer DNA fragments and capture more information about the gene structure and variation. However, this method is not widely available or affordable for clinical use.

== Protein ==
Steroid 21-hydroxylase, is a member of the cytochrome P450 family of monooxygenase enzymes, the protein has 494 amino acid residues with a molecular weight of 55,000. This enzyme is at most 28% homologous to other P-450 enzymes that have been studied.

Structurally, the protein contains an evolutionarily conserved core of four α-helix bundles (the importance of such genetic conservation is in demonstrating the functional importance of this aspect of this protein's structure). In addition, it has two additional alpha helices, two sets of β-sheets, and a heme cofactor binding loop. Each subunit in the human enzyme consists of a total of 13 α-helices and 9 β-strands that folds into a triangular prism-like tertiary structure.

The iron(III) heme group that defines the active site resides in the center of each subunit. The human enzyme binds one substrate at a time. In contrast, the well-characterized bovine enzyme can bind two substrates. The human and bovine enzyme share 80% amino acid sequence identity, but are structurally different, particularly in loop regions, and also evident in secondary structure elements.

== Species ==
Variations of the steroid 21-hydroxylase can be found in all vertebrates.

Cyp21 first emerged in chordates before the speciation between basal chordates and vertebrates. The sea lamprey, an early jawless fish species that originated over 500 million years ago, provides valuable insights into the evolution and emergence of Cyp21. Sea lampreys lack the 11β-hydroxylase enzyme responsible for converting 11-deoxycortisol to cortisol as observed in mammals. Instead, they rely on 11-deoxycortisol, a product of a reaction catalyzed by CYP21, as their primary glucocorticoid hormone with mineralocorticoid properties. This suggests the presence of a complex and highly specific corticosteroid signaling pathway that emerged at least half a billion years ago during early vertebrate evolution.

In vertebrates, such as fish, amphibians, reptiles, birds, and mammals, Cyp21 participates in the biosynthesis of glucocorticoids and mineralocorticoids, therefore, Cyp21 is essential for the regulation of stress response, electrolyte balance and blood pressure, immune system, and metabolism in vertebrates.

Cyp21 is relatively conserved among mammals, and shows some variations in its structure, expression, and regulation. Rhesus macaques and orangutans possess two copies of Cyp21, while chimpanzees have three, still, a pseudogene (CYP21A1P) is only present in humans among primates.

== Tissue and subcellular distribution ==
Steroid 21-hydroxylase is localized in microsomes of endoplasmic reticulum membranes within adrenal cortex. It is one of three microsomal steroidogenic cytochrome P450 enzymes, the others being steroid 17-hydroxylase and aromatase.

Unlike other enzymes of the cytochrome P450 superfamily of enzymes that are expressed in multiple tissues, with most abundant expression in the liver, in adult humans steroid 21-hydroxylase, along with steroid 11β-hydroxylase and aldosterone synthase, is almost exclusively expressed in the adrenal gland.

As of 2023, the main subcellular location for the encoded protein in human cells is not known, and is pending cell analysis.

== Function ==
Steroid numbering, C21 is in the side chain of C17

The enzyme, steroid 21-hydroxylase hydroxylates steroids at the C21 position. Steroids are a group of naturally occurring and synthetically produced organic compounds, steroids all share a four ring primary structure. The enzyme catalyzes the chemical reaction in which the hydroxyl group (-OH) is added at the C21 position of the steroid biomolecule. This location is on a side chain of the D ring.

The enzyme is a member of the cytochrome P450 superfamily of monooxygenase enzymes. The cytochrome P450 enzymes catalyze many reactions involved in drug metabolism and synthesis of cholesterol, steroids and other lipids.

Steroid 21-hydroxylase is essential for the biosynthesis of cortisol and aldosterone.

== Mechanism ==
Reaction scheme showing hydroxylation of progesterone (top) and 17a-hydroxyprogesterone (bottom)

Human steroidogenesis, showing both reactions of 21-Hydroxylase at center top.

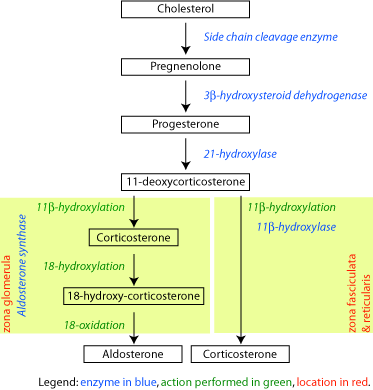
Corticosteroid biosynthetic pathway in the rat.

Steroid 21-hydroxylase is a cytochrome P450 enzyme that is notable for its substrate specificity and relatively high catalytic efficiency.

Like other cytochrome P450 enzymes, steroid 21-hydroxylase participates in the cytochrome P450 catalytic cycle and engages in one-electron transfer with NADPH-P450 reductase. Steroid 21-hydroxylase is highly specific for hydroxylation of progesterone and 17-hydroxyprogesterone. This specificity is in marked contrast to the evolutionarily and functionally related P450 enzyme 17-hydroxylase, which has a broad range of substrates.

The chemical reaction in which steroid 21-hydroxylase catalyzes the addition of hydroxyl (-OH) to the C21 position of progesterone, 17α-hydroxyprogesterone and 21-desoxycortisone was first described in 1952.

Studies of the human enzyme expressed in yeast initially classified 17-hydroxyprogesterone as the preferred substrate for steroid 21-hydroxylase, however, later analysis of the purified human enzyme found a lower K_{M} and greater catalytic efficiency for progesterone over 17-hydroxyprogesterone.

The catalytic efficiency of steroid 21-hydroxylase for conversion of progesterone in humans is approximately 1.3 × 10^{7} M^{−1}s^{−1} at 37 °C. This efficiency makes it the most catalytically efficient P450 enzyme of those reported to date, and catalytically more efficient than the closely related bovine steroid 21-hydroxylase enzyme. C-H bond breaking to create a primary carbon radical is thought to be the rate-limiting step in the hydroxylation.

== Clinical significance ==
=== Congenital adrenal hyperplasia ===
Genetic variants in the CYP21A2 gene cause a disturbance in the development of the enzyme, leading to congenital adrenal hyperplasia (CAH) due to 21-hydroxylase deficiency. Gene conversion events involving the functional gene and the pseudogene account for many cases of steroid 21-hydroxylase deficiency. CAH is an autosomal recessive disorder. There are multiple forms of CAH, defined as classical and nonclassical forms based on the amount of enzyme function still present in the patient.

The classical forms occur in approximately 1 in 10000 to 1 in 20000 births globally, and includes both the salt-wasting (excessive excretion of sodium via the urine causing hyponatremia and dehydration) and simple-virilizing forms. Complete loss of enzymatic activity causes the salt-wasting form. Variations in the structure of steroid 21-hydroxylase are related to the clinical severity of congenital adrenal hyperplasia. Cortisol and aldosterone deficits are associated with life-threatening sodium loss, as the steroids play roles in regulating sodium homeostasis. Simple-virilizing CAH patients (~1-2% enzyme function) maintain adequate sodium homeostasis, but exhibit other symptoms shared by the salt-wasting form, including accelerated growth in childhood and ambiguous genitalia in female neonates.

The nonclassical form is the mildest condition, retaining about 20% to 50% of enzyme function. This form is associated with mild and clinically silent cortisol impairment, but an excess of androgens post-puberty.

=== Non-classic congenital adrenal hyperplasia ===
Non-classical congenital adrenal hyperplasia caused by 21-hydroxylase deficiency (NCCAH) is a milder and late-onset congenital adrenal hyperplasia. Its prevalence rate in different ethnic groups varies from 1 in 1000 to 1 in 50. Some people affected by the condition have no relevant signs and symptoms, while others experience symptoms of hyperandrogenism.

Women with NCCAH usually have normal female genitalia at birth. In later life, the signs and symptoms of the condition may include acne, hirsutism, male-pattern baldness, irregular menstruation, and infertility.

Fewer studies have been published about males with NCCAH comparing to those about females, because males are generally asymptomatic. Males, however, may present with acne and early balding.

While symptoms are usually diagnosed after puberty, children may present with premature adrenarche.

=== Research on other conditions ===
There is ongoing research on how Genetic variants in the CYP21A2 gene may lead to pathogenic conditions. A variant of this gene has been reported to cause autosomal dominant posterior polar cataract, suggesting that steroid 21-hydroxylase may be involved in the extra-adrenal biosynthesis of aldosterone and cortisol in the lens of the eye.

=== History ===
In the 1950s and 1960s, steroidogenic pathways that included cholesterol conversion to progesterone through a complex pathway involving multiple steps were identified, and, among them, a pathway for cortisol synthesis showing specific enzymatic steps that included hydroxylation reactions at position 21 (21-hydroxylation) mediated by cytochrome P450 enzymes. Cytochrome P450 enzymes were then described, and steroid 21-hydroxylation was associated with cytochrome P450.

In the 1980s and 1990s, partial-length bovine Cyp21 cDNA clones were identified as related to human CYP21A2. Researchers discovered mutations in the CYP21A2 gene associated with congenital adrenal hyperplasia (CAH).

From the 1990s onward, specific mutations were correlated with different forms/severity levels of CAH. Genotype/phenotype correlations were investigated for improved diagnostic accuracy.

== See also ==
- Steroidogenic enzyme
- Cytochrome P450 oxidoreductase deficiency
