= Tenascin X =

Protein-coding gene in the species Homo sapiens

TNXB
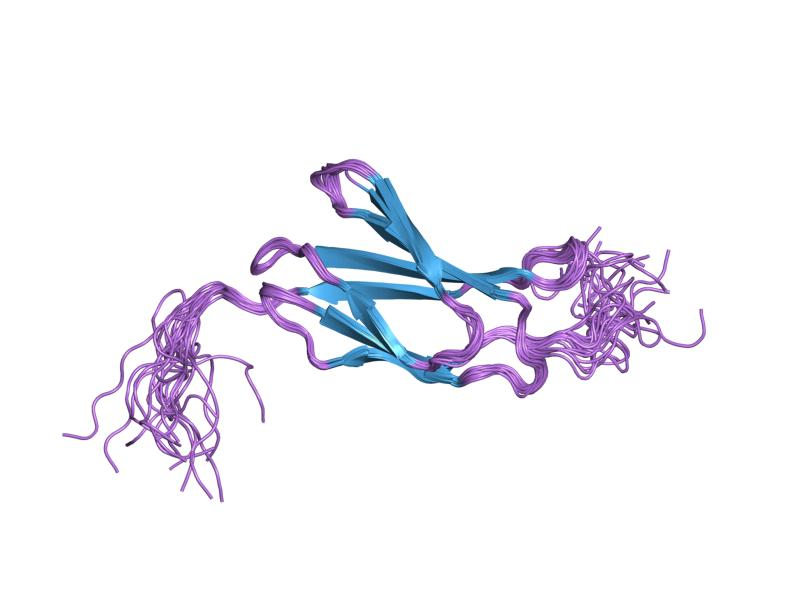

Identifiers
- Aliases: TNXB, EDS3, HXBL, TENX, TN-X, TNX, TNXB1, TNXB2, TNXBS, VUR8, XB, XBS, tenascin XB, EDSCLL, EDSCLL1
- External IDs: OMIM: 600985; MGI: 1932137; GeneCards: TNXB
Available structures
PDB	Human UniProt search: PDBe RCSB
PDB	List of PDB id codes 2CUH, 2CUI, 2CUM

Gene location (Human)
Chr.	Chromosome 6 (human)
Band	6p21.33-p21.32	Start	32,041,153 bp
Band	6p21.33-p21.32	End	32,115,334 bp

Gene location (Mouse)
Chr.	Chromosome 17 (mouse)
Band	17 B1|17 18.24 cM	Start	34,879,431 bp
Band	17 B1|17 18.24 cM	End	34,938,789 bp
RNA expression pattern
Bgee	Human / Mouse (ortholog); Top expressed in: apex of heart; right adrenal cortex; left adrenal gland; left adrenal cortex; gastric mucosa; right auricle of heart; body of uterus; left ovary; myometrium; tibial nerve / Top expressed in: ankle joint; ankle; extraocular muscle; sciatic nerve; tunica media of zone of aorta; plantaris muscle; extensor digitorum longus muscle; lactiferous gland; skin of external ear; medial head of gastrocnemius muscle; More reference expression data
BioGPS	n/a
Gene ontology
Molecular function	integrin binding; protein binding; heparin binding; extracellular matrix structural constituent; collagen fibril binding
Cellular component	extracellular matrix; intracellular anatomical structure; fibrillar collagen trimer; extracellular exosome; extracellular space; extracellular region; collagen-containing extracellular matrix
Biological process	collagen fibril organization; collagen metabolic process; extracellular matrix organization; cell adhesion; elastic fiber assembly; actin cytoskeleton organization
Sources:Amigo / QuickGO
Orthologs
Databases	NCBI: entry; OMA: entry
Species	Human	Mouse
Entrez	7148	81877
Ensembl	ENSG00000236236; ENSG00000236221; ENSG00000229353; ENSG00000229341; ENSG00000233323 ENSG00000231608; ENSG00000206258; ENSG00000168477	ENSMUSG00000033327
UniProt	P22105	n/a
RefSeq (mRNA)	NM_032470; NM_019105; NM_001365276	NM_031176
RefSeq (protein)	NP_061978; NP_115859; NP_001352205	n/a
Location (UCSC)	Chr 6: 32.04 – 32.12 Mb	Chr 17: 34.88 – 34.94 Mb
PubMed search
- Wikidata
View/Edit Human	View/Edit Mouse

Tenascin X (TN-X), also known as flexillin or hexabrachion-like protein, is a 450 kDa glycoprotein, a member of the tenascin family, that is expressed in connective tissues. In humans it is encoded by the TNXB gene.

The TN-X protein is expressed in many parts of the human body, including the skin, muscles, kidneys, blood vessels, and digestive tract.

Deficiencies in the TN-X protein due to mutations or not enough of it being produced (haploinsufficiency) can lead to a rare condition called classical-like Ehlers–Danlos syndrome (EDS). People with EDS may have loose joints and weak tissues because their bodies make defective collagen.

== Structure ==
TN-X possesses a modular structure composed, from the N- to the C-terminal part by a Tenascin assembly domain (TAD), a series of 18.5 repeats of epidermal growth factor (EGF)-like motif, a high number of Fibronectin type III (FNIII) module, and a fibrinogen (FBG)-like globular domain.

== Gene ==
=== TNXB (functional gene) ===
The TNXB gene localizes to the major histocompatibility complex (MHC class III) region on chromosome 6. The structure of this gene is unusual in that it overlaps the CREBL1 and CYP21A2 genes at its 5' and 3' ends, respectively.

=== TNXA (pseudogene) ===
The TNXB gene has an associated pseudogene, TNXA.

Both TNXA and TNXB genes are located within the RCCX cluster, which consists of a series of modules with genes close to each other: winged helix repair factor 1 (WHR1), complement 4 (C4), steroid 21-hydroxylase (CYP21), and tenascin-X (TNX). In a monomodular structure of the RCCX cluster, all of the genes are functional, i.e. protein-coding, but if there are two or more modules within the cluster, there is only one copy of each functional gene rest being non-coding pseudogenes with the exception of the C4 gene which always has active copies. For example, in a bimodular configuration most common among Europeans, the cluster consists of the following genes: WHR1-C4A-CYP21A1P-TNXA-STK19B-C4B-CYP21A2-TNXB. As such, TNXA is a duplicated copy of TNXB, but is incomplete, therefore, TNXA a pseudogene that is transcribed but does not encode a protein.

The presence of the pseudogene is a consequence of MHC class III locus duplication during evolution. Strong 3' homology between TNXB and TNXA can provoke genetic recombination between the two loci, thus leading to the apparition of TNXA/TNXB chimera.

== Function ==
TN-X is constitutively expressed in adult tissues such as skin, ligaments, tendons, lungs, kidneys, optic nerves, mammary and adrenal glands, blood vessels, testis, and ovaries. It is also found in different compartments of the digestive tract, including pancreas, stomach, jejunum, ileum, and colon. In this wide variety of organs, TN-X is mainly located within the connective tissue such as peritendineum (external structural component of tendons), epimysium and perimysium (muscle components), renal glomeruli, blood vessels and skin dermis. TN-X has been proposed to have an important structural and architectural function, especially within the skin. In fact, in vitro experiments demonstrate that TN-X physically interacts with fibrillar collagens type I, III and V, as well as FACIT (Fibrillar Associated Collagen with Interruption of the Triple helix) including type XII and XIV collagens. It also interacts with Transforming Growth Factor (TGF)-β which is a pro-fibrotic cytokine and Decorin, a small 100 kDa dermatan sulfate proteoglycan that is essential to collagen fibrillogenesis. In vivo, transmission electron microscopy coupled with immuno-labelling confirms the very close location of TN-X with collagen fibers in dermis, tendons and kidney glomeruli.

In addition to this architectural function, TN-X also demonstrated counter-adhesive properties, at least for human osteosarcoma cells (MG-63), murine embryonic fibroblasts (MRC-5) as well as human endothelial cells (ECV-304).

== Clinical significance ==
Homozygous mutations, heterozygous compound (bi-allelic) mutations or haploinsufficiency in TN-X cause classical-like Ehlers–Danlos syndrome (EDS), a rare and hereditary connective tissue disorder in mice and humans. This pathology is characterized by skin hyperlaxity, joint hypermobility and global tissue weakness as a consequence of elastin fragmentation and reduced collagen density, especially in skin.

== History ==
Tenascin-X (TNX) protein was discovered during studies of human steroidogenesis and its disorders, particularly in patients with 21-hydroxylase deficiency, rather than during studies of connective tissue disorders. Researchers sequenced a 2.7 kb cDNA clone that showed similarities to tenascin, leading to the identification of the XB gene. This gene was initially called "Gene X" because its nature and function were unknown at the time. Further research revealed that this gene encodes the Tenascin-X protein, which belongs to the family of tenascins.
