= HLA A1-B8-DR3-DQ2 =

Human genotype

- HLA region on chromosome 6

Nicknames
- "Super-B8", "AH8.1", "ancestral MHC 8.1"

Loci
Loci	Gene	Allele	Serotype
Class I	HLA-A	*0101	A1
Class I	HLA-C	*0701	Cw7
Class I	HLA-B	*0801	B8
HLA-DR	HLA-DRB1	*0301	DR3
HLA-DRB3	*0101	DR52
HLA-DQ	HLA-DQA1	*0501
HLA-DQB1	*0201	DQ2

Nodes
- Population_{Maxima}: Western Ireland
- Freq._{Max}: >11.0%

Size and location
- Genes: 311
- Chromosome: 6
- Location: 6p21.3
- Size (kbps): 4700

Associated diseases
Haplotype (gene)	Disease(s)
DQ2.5	Coeliac disease
DR3-DQ2	Juvenile diabetes, Sarcoidosis
B8::DQ2	Autoimmune hepatitis, Primary biliary cirrhosis, Myasthenia gravis, Dermatitis herpetiformis

HLA A1-B8-DR3-DQ2 haplotype (Also: AH8.1, COX, Super B8, ancestral MHC 8.1 or 8.1 ancestral haplotype) is a multigene haplotype that covers a majority of the human major histocompatibility complex on chromosome 6 (not to be confused with the HLA-DQ heterodimer DQ8.1). A multigene haplotype is set of inherited alleles covering several genes, or gene-alleles; common multigene haplotypes are generally the result of descent by common ancestry (share a recent common ancestor for that segment of the chromosome). Chromosomal recombination fragments multigene haplotypes as the distance to that ancestor increases in number of generations.

The haplotype can be written in an extended form covering the major histocompatibility loci as follows:

HLA A*0101 : Cw*0701 : B*0801 : DRB1*0301 : DQA1*0501 : DQB1*0201 or shorthand A1::DQ2

There are many other gene-alleles within the haplotype, including more than 250 coding loci that produce transcripts.

At 4.7 million nucleotides in length, A1::DQ2 is the second longest haplotype identified within the human genome. A1::DQ2 creates a conundrum for the evolutionary study of recombination. The length of the haplotype is remarkable because of the rapid rate of evolution at the HLA locus should degrade such long haplotypes. A1::DQ2's origin is difficult to trace, suggestions of a common ancestor in Iberia or Africa have been put forward. Although its place of origin is not certain there is agreement that bearers of the European AH8.1 bear a haplotype related by a common descent. A1::DQ2 is the most frequent haplotype of its length found in US Caucasians, ~15% carry this common haplotype.

Studies indicate that A1::DQ2 prominence is likely due to positive selection in the pre-Neolithic period and isolation in countries where wheat was not a prominent cereal. Outside of DR3-DQ2 with known associations to autoimmune disease, other factors within A1::DQ2 are believed to also contribute to autoimmune disease. Also a dozen inflammatory diseases of the immune system can attribute some risk to the haplotype. Some disease like coeliac disease primarily associate with certain genes. While other diseases, like type 1 diabetes may have several, highly different, genes that attribute risk. Still other diseases, like myasthenia gravis have undetermined linkage to the haplotype.

== Recombination dynamics ==
Each person has unique chromosomes, unless they are identical twins. These unique chromosomes are produced by recombination of each unique chromosome passed by each grandparent to each parent. These chromosome chimerize within the reproductive cells of each parent which are then passed to the developing person during fertilization. The recombination that creates these blended chromosomes occurs almost randomly along the length, 1 Morgan per generation. Within 100 generations in humans (about 2100 years in ancient times) one expects a few hundred of these 'blending' events to have occurred across a single chromosome, the average size is 1 centiMorgan (or 1 cM). The average length of these 'haplotypes' are about 1 million nucleotides.

Multigene haplotypes following standard dynamics only exist in robust populations for a short time, the average distance between genes of about 200,000 nts, which means that over 250 generations (~5000 years) one expects 1/2 of adjacent genes to have new gene-alleles, unless the genes are small and very close together. This dynamic can change if the population expands rapidly from a few individuals that lived in isolation as long as other haplotypes are maintained.

A1::DQ2 does not follow the expected dynamics. Other haplotypes exist in the region of Europe where this haplotype formed and expanded, some of these haplotypes also are ancestral and also are quite large. At 4.7 million nucleotides in length and ~300 genes the locus had resisted the effects of recombination, either as a consequence of recombination-obstruction within the DNA, as a consequence of repeated selection for the entire haplotype, or both.

== Structure ==
A1::DQ2 is 4,731,878 nucleotides in length. The haplotype begins before the TRIM27 locus approximately 28.8 million nucleotides from the telomere of chromosome 6's shorter arm. AH8.1 extends past the SYNGAP1 about 33.5 million nucleotides from the telomer. Marked deterioration occurs however after the DQB1 gene at 32.8 million nucleotides. A1::DQ2 is not the longest haplotype, but the longest, HLA A3-Cw7-B7-DR15-DQ6 (A3::DQ6), had already undergone significant recombination and is nearly equal in frequency to HLA A2-Cw7::DQ6 bearing version. In the US Caucasians, 57% of haplotypes with a core component, Cw7-B8, extend from HLA-A1 locus to DQ2 locus. This compares with 25% of Cw7-B7 that extend to A3::DQ6 Of 25 potential genetic recombinants of A1::DQ2, none exceed 10% of the Cw*0702-B*0801 frequency. Two recombinants A24-Cw7~DQ2, A1::B8-DR1-DQ5 are notable. Thus, A1::DQ2 haplotype is both long and shows greater deficiency of recombination (called linkage disequilibrium).

=== Evolution ===
The evolution of A1::DQ2 appears to be key to its structure. The haplotype, at 4.7 million nucleotide, exists in a population with other haplotypes which, when combined, exceed A1::DQ2 in frequency. Genetics of recombination in humans suggests that common haplotypes of this length that Cw7-B8 component should be in other haplotypes, Ax-Cw7::DQ2, A1-B8-DRx-DQx, or A1-B8-DR3-DQx (where Ax is not A1, DRx is not DR3, or DQx is not DQ2). For a haplotype of this length the process is fast, 50% loss of the complete haplotype within 500 years. And yet the haplotype is found largely intact in people who settled out of Europe hundreds of years ago.

==== Resistance to recombination ====
A1::DQ2 is found in Iceland, Pomors of Northern Russia, the Serbians of Northern Slavic descent, Basque, and areas of Mexico where Basque settled in larger numbers. The haplotypes great abundance in the most isolated geographic region of Western Europe, Ireland, in Scandinavians and Swiss suggests that low abundance in France and Latinized Iberia are the result of displacements that took place after the Neolithic onset. This implies a founding presence in Europe that exceeds 8000 years. The SNP analysis of the haplotype suggests a potential founding effect of 20,000 years within Europe, though conflicts in interpreting this information are now apparent. The last possible point of a constriction forcing climate was the Younger Dryas before 11,500 calendar years ago, and so the haplotype has taken on various forms of the name, Ancestral European Haplotype, lately called Ancestral Haplotype A1-B8 (AH8.1). It is one of 4 that appear common to western Europeans and other Asians. Assuming that the haplotype frequency was 50% at the Younger Dryas and declined by 50% every 500 years the haplotypes should only be present below 0.1% in any European population. Therefore, it exceeds the expected frequency for a founding haplotype by almost 100 fold.

==== Diet in Evolution ====
Beyond frequent interpretations of this nature, little more is known as to why the haplotype has not undergone equilibration. The haplotype appears to be recombination resistant, it appears to also have been under positive selection relative to other haplotypes in Europe, although currently disease instances suggest cereal-based negative selection is acting. One possible explanation comes from the study of remains of the pre-Neolithic period. Given food selects the haplotype now, might food have also positively selected the haplotype in the past. During the early period of European settlement, what remains of coastal settlements suggests a high marine-based food calorie intake, and, in particular, shellfish. Marine carbon component of Western European diet has declined from the Mesolithic to present, however the haplotype has not undergone equilibration, therefore diet alone cannot explain its resistance to recombination.

==== Formation ====
Of the haplotypes mentions above, A24-Cw*0702::DQ2 or A1::B8-DR1-DQ5, none appear to be ancestral to A1::DQ2. An A1::DQ2 appears in India, however its major antigen genes superficially resemble European A1-B8 and it appears to be a homoplastic recombinant from a common DR3-DQ2 ancestor, about 70,000 years ago. Components of the haplotype are found in Europe (Basque have two major haplotypes of DR3-DQ2) and A1-B8 of Indian origin is of very low frequency. In Morocco B8::DQ2, in the Western Sahara A1-B8 haplotype if found and also DQ2.5 is found in high frequency, but not as a single haplotype. In Kenya two slightly variant HLA-A and B alleles for an A1-B8 haplotype. One possibility is that peoples from central Asia or the Middle East migrated into Iberia as peoples from Africa crossed into Iberia from the south prior to the Neolithic, recombination occurred resulting in the haplotype, and bearers favorably expanded into Europe prior to the Holocene. Another possibility is that if formed in West Africa, but because it was less selective in African holocene relative to European holocene climate/culture, the haplotype underwent equilibration in N. Africa. One hypothesis supported by frequencies in Iberia and North Africa suggest that A1::DQ2 formed from A1::B8-DR7-DQ2 with DR3 bearing source. One possible source is the HLA Cw*1701 : B*4201 : DRB1*0302 (The most common haplotype in African Americans is an extended haplotype) However possible, it would require the introduction of a modified *0505 allele. In addition, the Indian/European branch of DQ2.5 is much older, thus it appears at least 2 major recombinant steps were required to form the haplotype, and after its formation evolution markedly slowed down.

=== Variants ===
There is a variant of A1←→B8 found in India. This variant carries the different Cw*07 (Cw*0702 is a very ancient allele that differs from Cw*0701 of A1::DQ2). It bears C4A a different DRB3 allele as well as numbers of other differences. This variant likely evolved from A24 or A26-Cw*0702-B*0801-DR3-DQ2 that independently arrived and evolved in India.

=== Components ===
Large haplotypes can be thought of as steps between adjacent loci. For example, A1-Cw*0701, Cw*0701-B8, B8 to DR3, and DR3-DQ2 are each steps. Each step is a haplotype in its own right, however, the closer two loci are together, the longer it takes recombination to alter the step. Both Cw-B and DR-DQ are close together, A-Cw and B-DR are far apart. As a result, components of a haplotype evolve at different paces.

==== A1-Cw7-B8 ====
Early studies of families across Europe recognized what most HLA associations had already shown, that there is an inherited (genetic) linkage between A1 and B1, this was extended to Cw7 locus.

And while the level of A-B linkage in general was nowhere near Cw-B linkage, the linkage between A1-Cw7-B8 was reasonably strong.

==== B8-DR3 ====
The region between and including B8 and DR3 bears a number of genes of interest in the study of human disease. Most important of which is the TNF (tumor necrosis factors) with 3 loci in the region. Starting from B8, immediately followed by the MICA and MICB which stand for MHC I-like chain A and B. These two functional class I molecules are expressed on intestinal interocytes and may have interest in autoimmune disease, they are variable, but the MICA mutants so-far found do not seem to correlate with autoimmune diseases of the GI tract.

==== HLA DR3-DQ2 ====
DR3-DQ2 is either a known or highly suspect factor in most autoimmune diseases that link to the A1::DQ2 haplotype.

== Importance to Medicine ==
=== In organ transplantion ===
A1::DQ2 was at the forefront of histocompatibility science, A1 was the first numerical antigen HL-A1 identified in the late 1960s. HL-A8 the second refined B-serotype to be uncovered became HLA-B8. Because of the frequency of the haplotype, homozygotes are common, about 0.6% if the population, make it useful for making cell lines that can be used to test serotyping antibodies. As a result, HLA-A1 and B8 produce some of the best serotyping antibodies. This aided in the proper identification of transplant matches prior to the era of PCR-gene testing.

B8-DR3
Nicknames
- "B8-DR3"; "B8-DR3" "B*0801:DRB1*0301""

Loci
Loci	Gene	Allele	Isoform
centomeric Class I region	HLA-B	B*0801	B8
centomeric Class I region	MICA	*0801	MICA5.1
centomeric Class I region	MICB	*0801	MICB24
RCCX HVR, Class III	TNFA	-	-
TNFB	-	-
C4A	Null	C4AQ0
C4B		C4BS

Nodes
- Population_{Maxima}: Western Ireland
- Freq._{Max}: >15.0%

Size and location
- Genes: -
- Chromosome: 6
- Location: 6p21.3
- Size (kbps): 1400

Associated diseases
Haplotype (gene)	Disease(s)
B8::DQ2	Autoimmune hepatitis, Primary biliary cirrhosis, Juvenile diabetes
B8::DR3	Systemic lupus erythematosus

=== In coeliac disease & dermatitis herpetiformis ===
Prior to refined typing for HLA-DQ and DR, the association with HLA-A1 and B8 was identified for coeliac disease in 1973 and dermatitis herpetiformis in 1976 . Because of the haplotype it became possible to identify the genetic risk even though disease causing genes, a DQ2 haplotype, was 1.3 million nucleotides away.

Aside from the highly studied link between DQ2.5 and coeliac disease, there are additional risk factors on the B8::DQ2 haplotype that increase risk of dermatitis herpetiformis in coeliac disease. The involvement of other A1::DQ2 gene-alleles in coeliac disease cannot be excluded, either. For example, MICA and MICB are mhc class 1 genes found expressed in the epithelium of the gut.

=== In insulin dependent diabetes mellitus ===
In type 1 diabetes both DR3 and DQ2 appear to play a role. DR3-DQ2.5 can be established to other genes like TNF-305A (TNF2) which may also increase the risk of autoimmune disease in both Coeliac Disease and Type 1 diabetes. In systemic lupus erythematosus (SLE) patients HLA DR3-DQ2.5-C4AQ0, which was strongly associated with SLE (odds ratio [OR] 2.8, 95% CI 1.7-4.5). A more recent paper shows that Inositol triphosphate receptor 3 gene which is ~ 1 million base pairs centromeric from DQ2.5 may also be associated with Type 1 diabetes. In addition the BAT1 and MICB variant is more common in type 1 diabetes when B8 is absent but DR3 is present These studies suggest multiple factors on B8::DQ2 that are possessed by other haplotypes also confer susceptibility to type 1 diabetes. Type 1 diabetes has a risk associated with coxsackie 4B virus, there is a potential for involvement of class I loci, particularly those expressed in the GI tract.

=== In myasthenia gravis ===
In 1975, association with "HL-A1,8" (Current name: HLA A1-B8) was confirmed by serological typing of cells from myasthenics. However, in a larger sample the risk association was found closer to "HL-A8" (Current name: HLA-B8). This association later migrated to the "B8-DRw3" (Current: B8-DR3) region. There are two major DR3 haplotypes in Europe, A1::DQ2 and A30-B18-DR3-DQ2. Linkage with disease could more firmly be attributed to B8::DQ2 portion of A1::DQ2 relative to A30-B18::DQ2, indicating some involvement of other B8-DR3 gene-alleles in disease. The association of the B8::DQ2 region is primarily seen in females with age-relative thymic hyperplasia. Later the level of anti-acetylcholine receptor antibodies in disease were found to correlate with B8::DR3. Later it was found that both DQ2.5 and DQ2.2(A DQ haplotype of DR7-DQ2) were positively associated with disease. There remains controversy over whether DR3 or DQ2 confers primary susceptibility to myasthenia gravis. In some studies no association with either has been observed. To segregate disease groups have attempted to further define population to earliest onset (presumbably most susceptibility) and females. In these studies link with B8 was greater than DR3, so that susceptibility moves from class II to Class III or Class I loci. The association with class I would be unusual since T-helper mediated autoantibody production is characteristic of disease, whereas class I mediated cytotoxicity is not. MICA and MICB are intestinally expressed. There are many genes that lie on either side of HLA-B, TNF alpha is over expressed. Closer to DR3, C4A is null in B8-DR3 haplotype.

=== In autoimmune hepatitis ===
In 1972, a link between "HLA A1,8" (current:HLA A1-B8) active chronic hepatitis, subsequently B8 better associated with autoimmune hepatitis. With the discovery of DR3, the linkage was extended to DR3 and subsequently to DQ2-DP4. While HLA A*0101, Cw*0701, and DPB1*0402 are linked to disease, the strongest association locates between B8 and DR3-DQ2, or the B8::DQ2 subregion. Other genes in the region, C4A-null and TNF may be associated with autoimmune hepatitis.

The appearance of anti-nuclear antibodies in autoimmune hepatitis was found to correlate with A1-B8-DR3. One of the problems with autoimmune hepatitis is there is an increased risk in coeliac disease. Primary biliary cirrhosis which often follows chronic active hepatitis is linked to "DRw3", DR3, gene. Celiac disease is often increased in autoimmune hepatitis and vice versa. Recent studies indicate a more insidious association between gluten sensitivity and autoimmune hepatitis. In one study 65% of patients with end stage autoimmune hepatitis had coeliac associated HLA-DQ (DQ2, DQ8), of these half had anti-transglutaminase antibodies, but few had endomysial antibody. This could indicate an association with subclinical enteropathy, or alternatively the result of chronic viral infection which is known to also elevate anti-tranglutaminase antibody. A German study found that risk was more associated with B8 than DQ2, these conflicting results indicate that there are at least two risk associations in the B8::DQ2 region.

=== In sarcoidosis ===
Like these other studies a link between "HL-A1,8" eventually leads to susceptibility close to the DR-DQ locus, Sarcoidosis appears to link to HLA-DR3-DQ2.

=== In systemic lupus erythromatosus ===
The "HL-A1,8 phenotype" was found to be associated with severe systemic lupus erythematosus (SLE) (renal and central nervous system involvement) in Caucasian patients. Two-point haplotype analysis between TNFB(B*01 allele) and HLA show that the allele is in linkage disequilibrium with HLA-A1, Cw7, B8, C4A(Null), DR3, DQ2.5. The entire haplotype, A1-Cw7-B8-TNFB*1-C4A(Null)-DR3-DQ2, is increased in patients and the genetic susceptibility to SLE cannot be distinguished. Linkage could not be extended to HLA-DPB1 locus. Outside of Europe the DRB1*0301 and DR3-DQ2 loci have been linked to disease independently of A1::DQ2 haplotype. DR3 is found to correlate with anti-Ro/La antibodies in SLE.

=== In inclusion body myositis, polymyositis and dermatomyositis ===
HLA-DR3 has been consistently observed at high frequencies in inclusion body myositis in caucasians. DR3 was found to correlate also with Jo-1 antibody presence. Studies of sporadic inclusion body myositis indicate association with A1:DQ2 haplotype. More recent studies indicate that risk lies solely between B8-DR3 region, this includes 3 class I genes, the class III gene region, and 2 class II genes. Research published in October 2015 by the National Institute of Environmental Health Sciences compared 1,710 cases of either adult- or juvenile-onset myositis, with 4,724 control subjects. They found that multiple genes that make up AH8.1 define the genetic risk for all types of myositis.

== See also ==
- Complement component 4
  - Complement component 4A
  - Complement component 4B

== Suggested reading ==
- Price P, Witt C, Allcock R, et al. (February 1999). "The genetic basis for the association of the 8.1 ancestral haplotype (A1, B8, DR3) with multiple immunopathological diseases". Immunol. Rev. 167: 257–74. doi:10.1111/j.1600-065X.1999.tb01398.x. PMID 10319267. S2CID 21104759.
- Horton R, Gibson R, Coggill P, et al. (January 2008). "Variation analysis and gene annotation of eight MHC haplotypes: the MHC Haplotype Project". Immunogenetics. 60 (1): 1–18. doi:10.1007/s00251-007-0262-2. PMC 2206249. PMID 18193213.
- Traherne JA, Horton R, Roberts AN, et al. (January 2006). "Genetic analysis of completely sequenced disease-associated MHC haplotypes identifies shuffling of segments in recent human history". PLOS Genet. 2 (1): e9. doi:10.1371/journal.pgen.0020009. PMC 1331980. PMID 16440057.
