= Complement component 4A =

Protein-coding gene in the species Homo sapiens

C4A
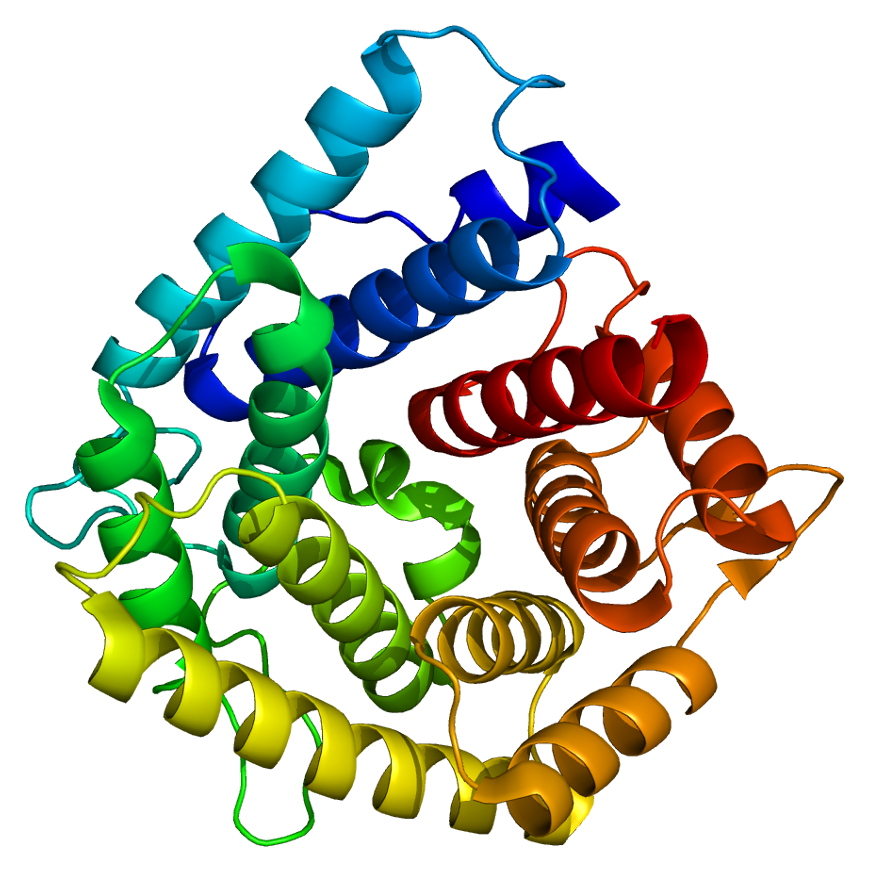

Identifiers
- Aliases: C4A, C4, C4A2, C4A3, C4A4, C4A6, C4AD, C4S, CO4, CPAMD2, RG, complement component 4A (Rodgers blood group), complement C4A (Rodgers blood group)
- External IDs: OMIM: 120810; MGI: 88228; GeneCards: C4A
Available structures
PDB	Ortholog search: PDBe RCSB
PDB	List of PDB id codes 1HZF, 4FXG, 4FXK, 4XAM

Gene location (Human)
Chr.	Chromosome 6 (human)
Band	6p21.33	Start	31,982,052 bp
Band	6p21.33	End	32,002,681 bp

Gene location (Mouse)
Chr.	Chromosome 17 (mouse)
Band	17 B1|17 18.29 cM	Start	34,947,354 bp
Band	17 B1|17 18.29 cM	End	34,962,856 bp
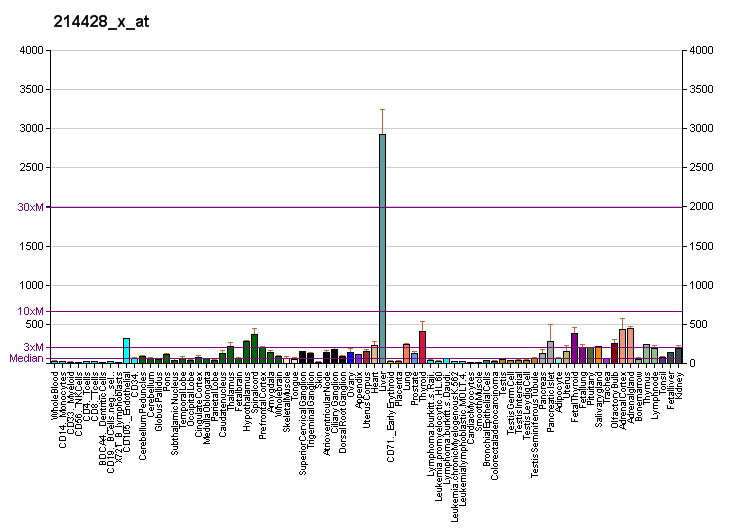

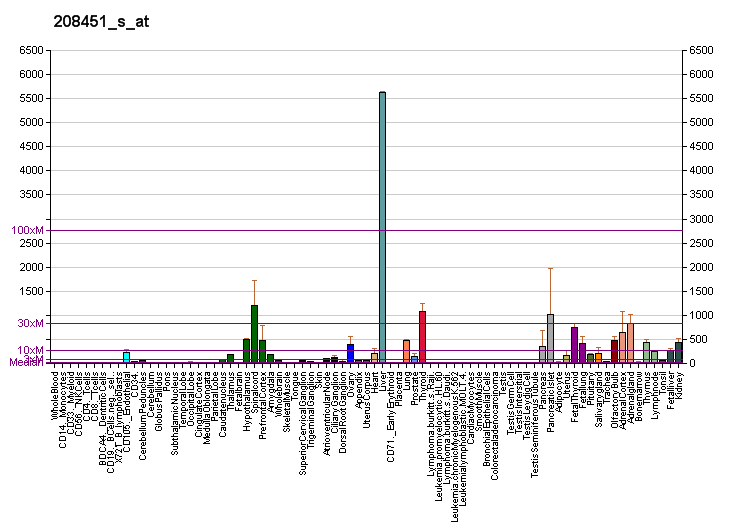
RNA expression pattern
Bgee	Human / Mouse (ortholog); Top expressed in: right lobe of liver; right adrenal cortex; left adrenal cortex; right lobe of thyroid gland; left lobe of thyroid gland; right ovary; tibial nerve; left ovary; anterior pituitary; spleen / Top expressed in: zone of skin; adrenal gland; white adipose tissue; synovial joint; ankle joint; spleen; liver; uterus; esophagus; urinary bladder; More reference expression data
BioGPS	More reference expression data
Gene ontology
Molecular function	endopeptidase inhibitor activity; complement component C1q complex binding; serine-type endopeptidase activity
Cellular component	extracellular region; plasma membrane; extracellular exosome; blood microparticle; cell projection; dendrite; cell junction; synapse; axon; soma; extracellular space; endoplasmic reticulum lumen
Biological process	complement activation; inflammatory response; positive regulation of apoptotic cell clearance; regulation of complement activation; negative regulation of endopeptidase activity; complement activation, classical pathway; immune system process; innate immune response; proteolysis; post-translational protein modification
Sources:Amigo / QuickGO
Orthologs
Databases	NCBI: entry; OMA: entry
Species	Human	Mouse
Entrez	720	12268
Ensembl	ENSG00000244207; ENSG00000206340; ENSG00000244731; ENSG00000227746	ENSMUSG00000073418
UniProt	P0C0L4	P01029
RefSeq (mRNA)	NM_001252204; NM_007293	NM_009780
RefSeq (protein)	NP_001239133; NP_009224	NP_033910
Location (UCSC)	Chr 6: 31.98 – 32 Mb	Chr 17: 34.95 – 34.96 Mb
PubMed search
- Wikidata
View/Edit Human	View/Edit Mouse

Complement component 4A is a protein that in humans is encoded by the C4A gene.

== Function ==
This gene encodes the acidic form of complement factor 4, part of the classical activation pathway. The protein is expressed as a single chain precursor which is proteolytically cleaved into a trimer of alpha, beta, and gamma chains prior to secretion. The trimer provides a surface for interaction between the antigen-antibody complex and other complement components. The alpha chain may be cleaved to release C4 anaphylatoxin, a mediator of local inflammation. Deficiency of this protein is associated with systemic lupus erythematosus and type I diabetes mellitus. Excess production due to a copy number that is higher than normal has shown a high probability of a causal relationship with schizophrenia and bipolar disorder with psychosis, which could explain the hereditary nature of these illnesses. This gene localizes to the RCCX locus within the major histocompatibility complex (MHC) class III region on chromosome 6. Varying haplotypes of this gene cluster exist, such that individuals may have 1, 2, or 3 copies of this gene. Each copy of the gene, due to five adjacent nucleotide substitutions cause four amino acid changes and immunological subfunctionalization, can be of one of two types: C4A and C4B. Each gene contains 41 exons and has a dichotomous size variation between approximately 22 kb and 16 kb, with the longer variant being the result of the integration of the endogenous retrovirus HERV-K(C4) into intron 9.

== See also ==
- Complement component 4
  - Complement component 4B
- HLA A1-B8-DR3-DQ2 haplotype
- Complement system
- Complement deficiency
