= Complement component 4B =

Protein-coding gene in the species Homo sapiens

C4B

Identifiers
- Aliases: C4B, C4B1, C4B12, C4B2, C4B3, C4B5, C4BD, C4B_2, C4F, CH, CO4, CPAMD3, Complement component 4B, complement component 4B (Chido blood group), complement C4B (Chido blood group)
- External IDs: OMIM: 120820; MGI: 88228; GeneCards: C4B
Available structures
| PDB | Ortholog search: PDBe RCSB |
| PDB | List of PDB id codes 1HZF, 4FXG, 4FXK, 4XAM,%%s4XAM |

Gene location (Human)
| Chr. | Chromosome 6 (human) |
| Band | 6p21.33 | Start | 32,014,795 bp |
| Band | 6p21.33 | End | 32,035,418 bp |

Gene location (Mouse)
| Chr. | Chromosome 17 (mouse) |
| Band | 17 B1|17 18.29 cM | Start | 34,947,354 bp |
| Band | 17 B1|17 18.29 cM | End | 34,962,856 bp |
RNA expression pattern
| Bgee | Human / Mouse (ortholog); Top expressed in: right lobe of liver; right adrenal cortex; left adrenal cortex; right lobe of thyroid gland; left lobe of thyroid gland; right ovary; tibial nerve; left ovary; anterior pituitary; spleen / Top expressed in: zone of skin; adrenal gland; white adipose tissue; synovial joint; ankle joint; spleen; liver; uterus; esophagus; urinary bladder; More reference expression data |
| BioGPS | n/a |
Gene ontology
| Molecular function | endopeptidase inhibitor activity; complement component C1q complex binding; serine-type endopeptidase activity; complement binding; carbohydrate binding |
| Cellular component | extracellular region; plasma membrane; extracellular exosome; blood microparticle; cell projection; dendrite; cell junction; synapse; axon; soma; extracellular space; endoplasmic reticulum lumen |
| Biological process | complement activation; inflammatory response; positive regulation of apoptotic cell clearance; regulation of complement activation; negative regulation of endopeptidase activity; complement activation, classical pathway; immune system process; innate immune response; proteolysis; post-translational protein modification; opsonization |
Sources:Amigo / QuickGO
Orthologs
| Databases | NCBI: entry; OMA: entry |
| Species | Human | Mouse |
| Entrez | 721 | 12268 |
| Ensembl | ENSG00000228267; ENSG00000236625; ENSG00000224389; ENSG00000228454; ENSG00000224639 n/a | ENSMUSG00000073418 |
| UniProt | P0C0L4; P0C0L5 | P01029 |
| RefSeq (mRNA) | NM_001002029 | NM_009780 |
| RefSeq (protein) | NP_001239133; NP_009224; NP_001229752 | NP_033910 |
| Location (UCSC) | Chr 6: 32.01 – 32.04 Mb | Chr 17: 34.95 – 34.96 Mb |
| PubMed search |
- Wikidata
| View/Edit Human | View/Edit Mouse |

Complement component 4B (Chido blood group) is a kind of the Complement component 4 protein that in humans is encoded by the C4B gene.

This gene encodes the basic form of complement factor 4, part of the classical activation pathway. The protein is expressed as a single chain precursor which is proteolytically cleaved into a trimer of alpha, beta, and gamma chains prior to secretion. The trimer provides a surface for interaction between the antigen-antibody complex and other complement components. The alpha chain may be cleaved to release C4 anaphylatoxin, a mediator of local inflammation. Deficiency of this protein is associated with systemic lupus erythematosus. This gene localizes to the RCCX locus within the major histocompatibility complex (MHC) class III region on chromosome 6. Varying haplotypes of this gene cluster exist, such that individuals may have 1, 2, or 3 copies of this gene. In addition, this gene exists as a long form and a short form due to the presence or absence of a 6.4 kb endogenous HERV-K retrovirus in intron 9. [provided by RefSeq, Jul 2008]. Each copy of the gene, due to five adjacent nucleotide substitutions cause four amino acid changes and immunological subfunctionalization, can be of one of two types: C4A and C4B. Each gene contains 41 exons and has a dichotomous size variation between approximately 22 kb and 16 kb, with the longer variant being the result of the integration of the endogenous retrovirus HERV-K(C4) into intron 9.

== See also ==
- Complement component 4
  - Complement component 4A
- HLA A1-B8-DR3-DQ2 haplotype
- Complement system
- Complement deficiency
