= Fibril =

Structural material present in almost all organic life

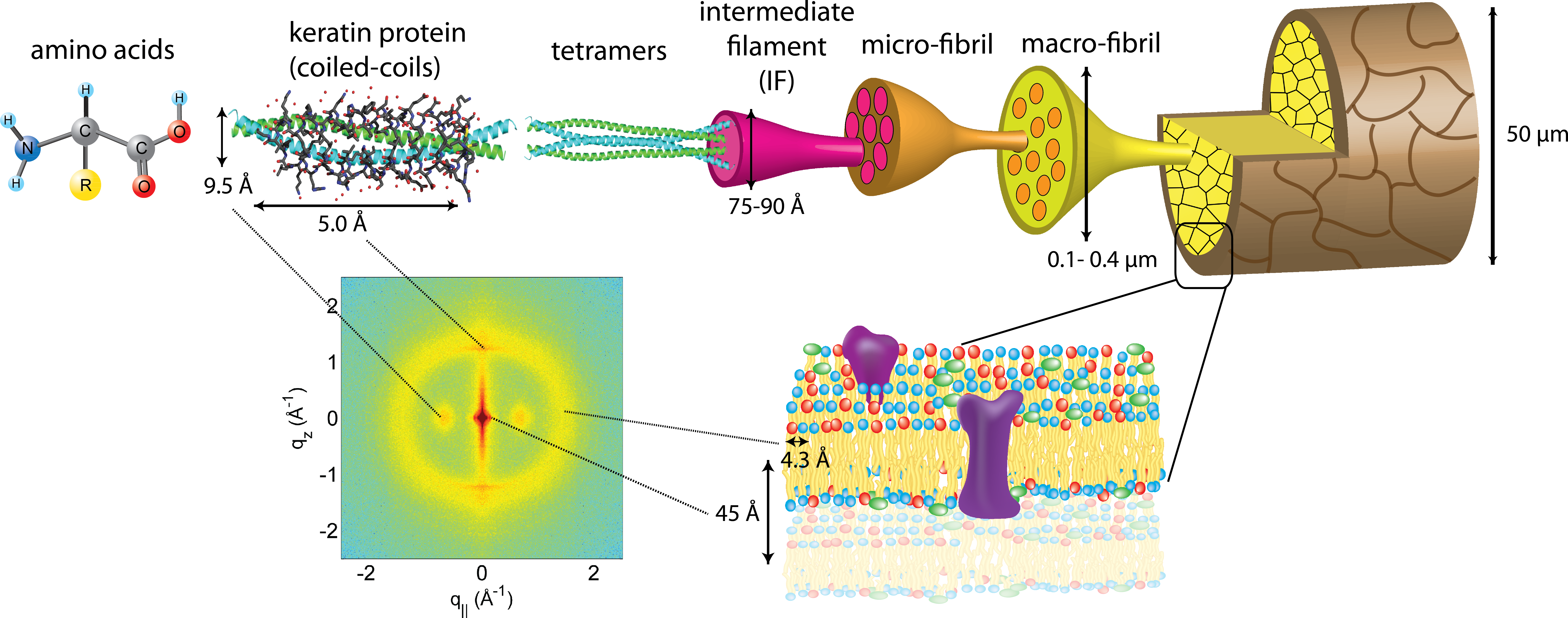
Hierarchical structure of hair in the cortex and cuticle, highlighting the scale which defines fibrils.

Fibrils (from Latin fibra) are structural biological materials found in nearly all living organisms. Not to be confused with fibers or filaments, fibrils tend to have diameters ranging from 10 to 100 nanometers (whereas fibers are micro to milli-scale structures and filaments have diameters approximately 10–50 nanometers in size). Fibrils are not usually found alone but rather are parts of greater hierarchical structures commonly found in biological systems. Due to the prevalence of fibrils in biological systems, their study is of great importance in the fields of microbiology, biomechanics, and materials science.

== Structure and mechanics ==
Fibrils are composed of linear biopolymers, and are characterized by rod-like structures with high length-to-diameter ratios. They often spontaneously arrange into helical structures. In biomechanics problems, fibrils can be characterized as classical beams with a roughly circular cross-sectional area on the nanometer scale. As such, simple beam bending equations can be applied to calculate flexural strength of fibrils under ultra-low loading conditions. Like most biopolymers, stress-strain relationships of fibrils tend to show a characteristic toe-heel region before a linear, elastic region. Unlike biopolymers, fibrils do not behave like homogeneous materials, as yield strength has been shown to vary with volume, indicating structural dependencies. Hydration has been shown to produce a noticeable effect in the mechanical properties of fibrillar materials. The presence of water (an aldehyde) has been shown to decrease the stiffness of collagen fibrils, as well as increase their rate of stress relaxation and strength. From a biological standpoint, water content acts as a toughening mechanism for fibril structures, allowing for higher energy absorption and greater straining capabilities.

Fibrils mechanical strengthening properties originate at the molecular level. The forces distributed in the fiber are tensile load carried by the fibril and shear forces felt due to interaction with other fibril molecules. The fracture strength of individual collagen molecules is as a result controlled by covalent chemistry between molecules. The shear strength between two collagen molecules is controlled by weak dispersive and hydrogen bond interactions and by some molecular covalent crosslinks. Slip in the system occur when these intermolecular bonds face an applied stress greater than their interaction strength. Intermolecular bonds breaking do not immediately lead to failure, in contrast they play an essential role in energy dissipation that lower the stress felt overall by the material and enable it to withstand fracture. These bonds, often hydrogen bonding and dispersive Van der Waals interactions, act as "sacrificial" bonds, existing for the purpose of lowering stress in the network. Molecular covalent crosslinks also play a key role in the formation of fibril networks. While crosslinking molecules can lead to strong structures, too much crosslinking in biopolymer networks are more likely to fracture as the network is not able to dissipate the energy, leading to a material that is strong but not tough. This is observed in dehydrated or aged collagen, explaining why with age human tissues become more brittle.

Differences in structure between fibrils of different origin is typically determined by x-ray diffraction. A scanning electron microscope (SEM) can be used to observe specific details on larger fibril species such as the characteristic 67 nm bands in collagen, but often is not fine enough to determine the full structure.

=== Contributions to mechanical properties of biomaterials ===
Natural materials show a combination of normally contradicting mechanical properties (softness and toughness), due to their hierarchical structures of fibrils across multiple length scales. These fibrils are often oriented in a single direction, leading to anisotropic mechanical response in the resulting biocomposite material. This is a prime advantage as most of these materials withstand stresses in a single direction, and so a higher yield and fracture stress in the direction of the applied stress ensures the material structural integrity. Macro, micro, and nano fibrils enable the material to resist fracture through a series of fracture resistance mechanisms:

1. Fibrillar sliding, or the process of shear as load is applied, enabling plasticity
2. Fibril bridging across the region of a crack
3. Crack deflection at the tip of crack, where stress concentration can lead to further propagation and eventual failure.

These mechanisms work together to resist fracture, allowing these materials to withstand millions of cycles of load without failure, essential for mobile living beings. Another mechanical advantage of biopolymers is their ability to be strained, resulting from the existence of strong fibrillar structures in a more compliant matrix material. The good deformability of interfacial matrices plays a key role in allowing for reorientation of constituents during deformation.

Fibrillogenesis is the expansion of fine fibrils which is common in collagen fibers of connective tissue. The definite mechanisms of fibrillogenesis are still unknown, although many hypotheses resulting from basic research help discover many possible mechanisms. In early experiments, collagen I could be distilled from tissues and recombined into fibrils with controlling the solutions. Later studies help understand the composition and structure of binding sites on the collagen monomers. Collagen is synthesized as a soluble precursor, procollagen, which supports collagen self-assembly. Since collagen fibrils have almost 50 binding components in vivo, the definite requirement to generate fibrillogenesis in vivo is still cryptic.

With acidic or saline solution, collagen can be extracted from tissues and rearrange into fibril by changing temperature or pH value. Experiments discovered attractive force between collagen monomers which helps the rearrangement. Collagen serves as a precursor, procollagen, in synthesizing reaction, which identifies self-polymerization of collagen.

=== Natural processes ===
There are over 30 collagens in nature that are similar in chemical composition but differ in terms of crystal structure. By far, collagen I and II are the most abundant. They initiatively form fibrils in vitro, while fibronectin, fibronectin-binding, collagen-binding integrins and collagen V are essential for collagen I forming and collagen XI for collagen II forming. Therefore, cellular mechanisms play key role in the protein self-assembly process.

== In animals ==
=== Collagen ===
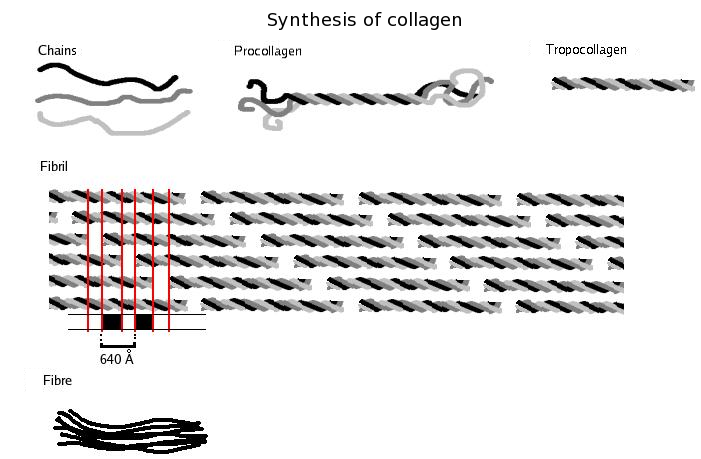
Structure of Collagen I fibrils

Collagen is the major structural protein outside cells in many connective tissues of animals. As the primary component of connective tissue, it has the largest amount among protein in mammals, occupying 25% to 35% of all protein content in the body.

The fibrils in collagen are packed in a crimp structure. The stress/strain curve of collagen, such as tendon, can be subdivided into several regions. The region of small strains, "toe" region, corresponds to the removal of a macroscopic crimp, uncrimping, in the collagen fibrils, visible in light microscope. At larger strains, "heel" and "linear" region, there's no further structural change visible.

Tropocollagen is the molecular component fiber, consisting of three left handed polypeptide chains (red, green, blue) coiled around each other, forming a right-handed triple helix.

=== Actin and myosin ===
Muscles contract and stretch via the steerable sliding/grasping of the myosin interacting with actin fibers. Actin consists of two polypeptides in a helix and myosin has a small heart-shaped structure, cross-bridge. The bind and unbind processes of cross-bridge attaching on actin filament help relative movement of these collagens and hence the whole muscle.

=== Elastin and keratin ===
Elastin is a fibrous protein common in various soft tissues, like skin, blood vessels and lung tissue. Each monomer connects with each other, forming a 3D network, with ability to endure over 200% strain before deformation.

Keratin is a structural protein mainly found in hair, nails, hooves, horns, quills. Basically keratin is formed by polypeptide chains, which coil into α-helices with sulfur cross-links or bond into β-sheets linked by hydrogen bonding. β-keratin, which is tougher than α-conformation, is more common in birds and reptiles.

=== Resilin and spider silk ===
Resilin is an elastomeric insect protein, consisting of both α-helices and β-sheets structure. It is one of the most resilient protein in nature. It has a low stiffness ~0.6MPa but a high energy restoring percentage ~98%, and efficiently helps flying insects to flap wings or fleas to jump.

Spider silk fibril is composed of stiff crystallized β-sheets structure, responsible for strength, and amorphous matrix surrounding, improving toughness and elongation ability. It has exceptionally high tensile strength and ductility, with respectively low density, compared to other natural fibril. Its feature varies from different kinds of spider for different utility.

== In plants ==
=== Cellulose ===
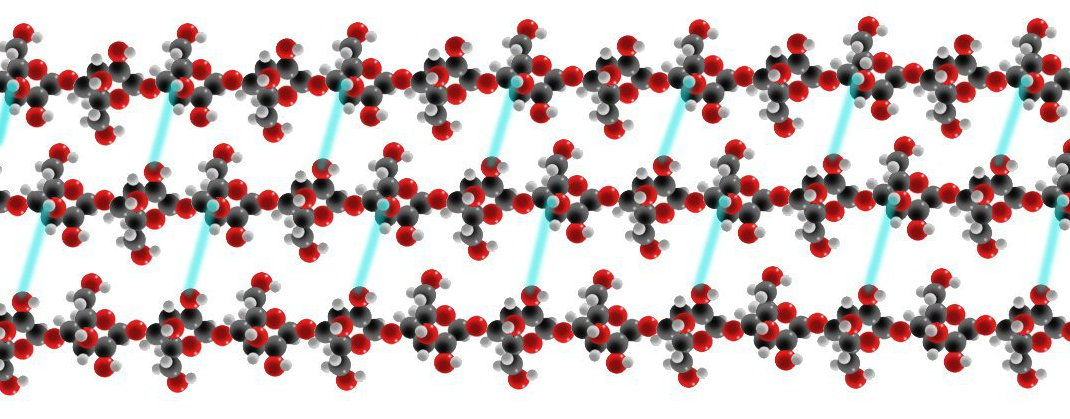
Space fill model of cellulose, prior to winding into fibrils

The primary cell wall derives its notable tensile strength from cellulose molecules, or long-chains of glucose residues stabilized by hydrogen bonding. Cellulose chains are observed to align in overlapping parallel arrays, with the similar polarity forming a cellulose microfibril. In plants, these cellulose microfibrils arrange themselves into layers, formally known as lamellae, and are stabilized in the cell wall by surface, long cross-linking glycan molecules. Glycan molecules increase the complexity of the potential networks plant-based cellulose can configure itself into. Coextensive in the primary cell wall to both cellulose microfibrils and complementary glycan networks, is pectin which is a polysaccharide that contains many negatively charged galacturonic acid units. Additionally, cellulose microfibrils also contribute to the shape of the plant via controlled-cell expansion. The stereoscopic arrangement of microfibrils in the cell wall create systems of turgor pressure which ultimately leads to cellular growth and expansion. Cellulose microfibrils are unique matrix macromolecules, in that they are assembled by cellulose synthase enzymes located on the extracellular surface of the plasma membrane. It is believed that the plant can "anticipate their future morphology by controlling the orientation of microfibrils" by a mechanism where cellulose microfibrils are arranged atop a cortical array of microtubules.

=== Amylose ===
Stirring of a given sample of amylose is said to form fibrillar crystals which are said to precipitate out of the mother liquor. These long fibrils can be imaged using electron microscopy revealing transverse striations resembling a shish-kebab. Amylose fibrils are categorized with having one of two morphologies: ones with small rodlike fibrils and others with lath-shaped crystals.

=== Wood ===
The fibrillar structure of wood is said to play a significant role in both the mechanical stability and ability of wood to possess channels to transport minerals and water. Sprucewood (Picea abies), among others, are reported to possess cellulose fibrils with a normalized diameter of 2.5 nm. There is also a reported link between the age of the wood and the spiral angle of the fibrils with respect to the longitudinal direction. Earlywood is said to have a consistent 4.6 ± 0.6° rest angle, whereas latewood is said to have a transition region from 4.6° to 19.8 ± 0.7°. In latewood, the two spiral angle regions of cellulose fibrils are not continuous, meaning that there are two independent tracheid structures in "older" trees meeting different mechanical requirements. Moreover, longitudinally oriented fibrils improve tensile strength, whereas the addition of 20° tilted fibrils, exclusive to latewood tracheids, provides stability against compression.

== Biomimicry and fibrils ==
=== Self-cleaning properties ===
In order to mimic the strong adhesion, easy detachment, and self-cleaning properties of a gecko toe pad, a fibrillar-based adhesive can be created. These performance features stem from the underlying hierarchical structure which consists of a million microfibrils called setae which further consists of billions of nano-sized branches called spatulae.

Mimicking this phenomenon involves four distinct design steps:

1. Making a vertically aligned micro-/nano- fibrillar arrays
2. Creating various tip shapes
3. Including anisotropic geometry
4. Building hierarchy.

=== A mature bone matrix ===
In order to mimic a mature bone matrix, self-assembled fibrils can be used to align a given mineral matrix. This is accomplished using a self-assembling molecule with a hydrophobic alkyl tail and a hydrophilic oligopeptide head. These molecules form micellar structures in situ, and disulfide bridges at low pH, leading to the formation and crystallization of 200 kDa polymeric nanofibrils. The mineral matrix ultimately interacts with the synthetic fibril via a phosphoserine residue which results in mineral nucleation and growth.

== See also ==
- Fibre
- Microfibril
- Myofibril
- Neurofibril
- Fibrillogenesis
- Protein filament
