= RCCX =

Human genetic cluster on chromosome 6

RCCX is a complex, multiallelic, and tandem copy number variation (CNV) human DNA locus on chromosome 6p21.3, a cluster located in the major histocompatibility complex (MHC) class III region. CNVs are segments of DNA that vary in copy number compared to a reference genome and contribute to human phenotypic variation and disease development. The RCCX cluster consists of one or more modules each having a series of genes close to each other: winged helix repair factor 1 (WHR1), complement 4 (C4), steroid 21-hydroxylase (CYP21), and tenascin-X (TNX).

== Name ==
The RCCX abbreviation is composed of the names of the genes RP (a former name for WHR1 winged helix repair factor 1), C4, CYP21 and TNX).

== Structure ==
The number of RCCX segments varies between one and four in a chromosome, with the prevalence of approximately 15% for monomodular, 75% for bimodular (STK19-C4A-CYP21A1P-TNXA-STK19B-C4B-CYP21A2-TNXB), and 10% for trimodular in Europeans. The quadrimodular structure of the RCCX unit is very rare.

In a monomodular structure, all of the genes are functional i.e. protein-coding, but if a module count is two or more, there is only one copy of each functional gene rest being non-coding pseudogenes with the exception of the C4 gene which always has active copies. Each copy of the C4 gene, due to five adjacent nucleotide substitutions cause four amino acid changes and immunological subfunctionalization (different functions related to the immune system), can be of one of two types: C4A and C4B. Each C4 gene contains 41 exons and has a dichotomous size variation (existence of two distinct sizes) between approximately 22 kb and 16 kb, with the longer variant being the result of the integration of the endogenous retrovirus HERV-K(C4) into intron 9.

The RCCX module is the most complex gene cluster in the human genome. It is part of the major histocompatibility complex (MHC) class III (MHC class III), which is the most gene-dense region of the human genome, containing many genes that yet have unknown function or structure. RCCX modules exhibit a high degree of linkage disequilibrium, meaning that genes are inherited together more frequently than would be expected by chance. This pattern indicates that there is a non-random association or correlation between the alleles of different genes within the RCCX modules. The high degree of linkage disequilibrium observed in the RCCX modules suggests that the genes within this module are inherited as a group, rather than independently. This grouped inheritance makes the RCCX module well-suited for genetic association studies, especially in the context of autoimmune diseases.

== Function ==
The RCCX module is involved in the synthesis of the steroid hormones cortisol, aldosterone, and androgen precursors, in extracellular matrix glycoprotein synthesis, and in innate immune system.

The RP gene (a former name for the WHR1 gene) is involved in cell growth and differentiation, but its exact functions remain unclear. Current knowledge suggests that the STK19/WHR1 gene encodes the protein called nuclear serine/threonine kinase 19. This protein probably plays a role in regulating the activity of neuroblastoma RAS viral oncogene homolog (NRAS), a protein involved in cellular signaling. STK19 phosphorylates NRAS, which means it adds a phosphate functional group to NRAS. This phosphorylation event facilitates interactions between NRAS and its downstream effectors, which are molecules that carry out specific cellular functions. By increasing the activation of the mitogen-activated protein kinase (MAPK) cascade, STK19 ultimately influences cellular processes such as cell growth, proliferation, and differentiation.

The C4 gene encodes the complement component 4, which is involved in the complement system and is an important part of the innate immune system. The gene has two forms: C4A and C4B, encoding form A and B of the complement component 4 protein, respectively.

The CYP21A2 gene encodes the enzyme 21-hydroxylase involved in synthesizing cortisol and aldosterone.

The TNXB gene encodes the Tenascin X, an extracellular matrix glycoprotein. Tenascin X is involved in the formation and maintenance of the extracellular matrix, which provides structural support and regulates cell behavior. Tenascin X is also involved in tissue repair and regeneration and musculoskeletal development. Tenascin X interacts with other extracellular matrix proteins such as fibrillin-1 and collagen and is thought to play a role in regulating their organization and function.

== Clinical significance ==
The RCCX module is related to personality traits such as novelty seeking and impulsivity as major histocompatibility complex (MHC), where the RCCX module is located, may affect these traits through its role in immune function and neurodevelopment, still, the exact mechanisms are not fully understood.

Variations in complement component C4 genes within the RCCX module have been associated with psychiatric disorders such as schizophrenia and neurodegenerative diseases such as Alzheimer's disease.

The RCCX module may be involved in developing autoimmune diseases such as rheumatoid arthritis, systemic lupus erythematosus, and multiple sclerosis: the C4A gene may be associated with an increased risk of systemic lupus erythematosus, while the C4B gene may be associated with an increased risk of rheumatoid arthritis. The HERV-K retrovirus within the C4 gene has also been associated with autoimmune diseases such as systemic lupus erythematosus and rheumatoid arthritis, probably because retrovirus may activate the C4 gene, leading to increased production of C4 proteins, which can contribute to autoimmune responses, and can probably lead to neuroinflammation, and increased risk of developing diseases such as schizophrenia and bipolar disorder.

The presence of multiple RCCX modules is also associated with an increased risk of autoimmune diseases.

The CYP21 gene is associated with developing congenital adrenal hyperplasia due to 21-hydroxylase deficiency (CAH), a genetic disorder that affects the adrenal glands and causes cortisol deficiencies and excessive androgen biosynthesis (that may lead to virilization of female infants) and in severe cases also aldosterone deficiencies (that may lead to salt wasting - large amounts of sodium in urine that causes such life-threatening consequences as hypotension, hyponatremia, and hyperkalemic metabolic acidosis).

The TNXB gene, also known as tenascin-X, is associated with such disorders of connective tissue, such as Ehlers–Danlos syndrome (EDS), characterized by joint hypermobility, skin hyperextensibility, and tissue fragility. Another disorder, when recombination events occur between a pseudogene TNXA and the functional gene TNXB within the RCCX module, resulting in CYP21A2 deletion along with impaired TNXB function, is called CAH-X Syndrome and leads to both congenital adrenal hyperplasia (CAH) symptoms and features consistent with EDS. This impaired function of the TNXB gene refers to the decreased production or abnormal structure of the tenascin-X protein due to genetic changes within the TNXB gene. The exact molecular mechanisms through which alterations or deficiencies in the TNXB gene or its impaired function lead to these conditions (the EDS and the CAH-X syndrome) are not fully understood yet but are believed to be related to defects in extracellular matrix organization and cell adhesion processes mediated by tenascin-X protein.
