= Fibrillogenesis =

Fibrillogenesis is the development of fine fibrils normally present in collagen fibers of connective tissue. It is derived from the New Latin fibrilla (meaning fibrils, or pertaining to fibrils) and Greek genesis (to create, the process by which something is created).

The assembly of collagen fibrils, fibrillogenesis appears to be a self-assembly process although there is much speculation about the specifics of the mechanism through which the body produces collagen fibrils. In the body, collagen fibrils are composed of several types of collagen as well as macromolecules. Type I collagen is the most abundant structural macromolecule within the vertebrate body and also represents the most abundant collagen found within various collagen fibrils There are immense differences in the types of collagen fibrils that exist within the body. For instance, fibrils within the tendon vary in width and are banded into aggregates that form fibril bundles that resist forces of tension within one dimension. Similarly, fibrils that form the translucent corneal stromal matrix form orthogonal sheets and withstand the force of traction in two dimensions. These two structurally different collagen fibrils are speculated to be formed from the same molecules with type I collagen being the primary collagen found within both structures.

== Synthesis ==
There is no concrete evidence or agreement on the exact mechanisms of fibrillogenesis, however, multiple hypotheses based on primary research have put forth various mechanisms to consider. Collagen fibrillogenesis occurs in the plasma membrane during embryonic development. Collagen within the body has a denaturation temperature between 32-40 degrees Celsius, the physiological temperature also falls within this range and thereby poses a significant problem. It is not known how collagen survives within the tissues in order to yield itself to the formation of collagen fibrils. A postulated solution to the problem of denaturation, is that newly formed collagen gets stored in vacuoles. The storage vacuoles also contain molecular aggregates that provide the required thermal stability to allow for fibrillogenesis to occur within the body. In the body, fibrillar collagens have over 50 known binding partners. The cell accounts for the variety of binding partners through the localization of the fibrillogenesis process to the plasma membrane in order to maintain control of which molecules bind to each other and further ensure both fibril diversity and assemblies of certain collagen fibrils in different tissues Kader, Hill, and Canty-Larid published a plausible mechanism for the formation of collagen fibrils. Fibronectin a glycoprotein that binds to receptor proteins known as integrins within the cytoskeleton is a key player in the hypothesized method of fibrillogenesis. The interaction between fibronectin and the integrin receptor causes a conformational change in the fibronectin. Additional receptors bind to fibronectin bringing in type I collagen, procollagen I and collagen V. These molecules interact with fibronectin to promote fibril formation on the surface of the cell.

== Regulation ==
Based on research using mice and studies of Ehlers-Danlos syndromes (EDS), which is characterized by hypermobility of the joints, and high levels of skin laxity, researcher found that tenascin X expression levels correlated with the number of present collagen fibrils. In humans, tenascin X is associated with EDS. Through their research, researcher confounded the original hypothesis that tenascin X interfered with collagen fibrillogenesis and suggest that it acts rather as a regulator of collagen fibrillogenesis. Data suggest tenascin is a regulator of collagen fibril spacing. In vitro tests yield evidence that suggest tenascin X accelerates collagen fibril formation through an additive mechanism when collagen VI is present. In addition to tenascin X, multiple proteins, glycoconjugates, and small molecules have shown to influence not only the rate of collagen fibrillogenesis, but also the structure of collagen fibrils as well as their size in lab studies.

== Turbidity tests ==
Fibrillogenesis can be analyzed through the use of turbidity tests. Turbidity is way of measuring the haziness, cloudiness, or fogginess of sample and also can be used to test the light-scattering properties of said sample. A turbidity test on fibrillogenesis will start with a sample of collagen triple-helices, which will have a low-level of turbidity. After fibrillogenesis is completed, the triple-helices will have formed fibrils. A sample of fibrils will have a high-level of turbidity when compared to that of a sample of triple-helices. As fibrillogenesis is taking place, there is a change in the light-scattering properties of the sample over time, which can be measured with a spectrophotometer. The wavelength typically used to measure fibrillogenesis with a spectrophotometer ranges from 310nm to 313nm. Turbidity tests done on type I collagen triple-helices will display a sigmoidal curve when plotted on a graph. The sigmoidal curve is divided into three phases; lag phase, growth phase, and plateau phase.

== Clinical significance ==
A better understanding of the mechanisms of collagen fibrillogenesis as well as an understanding of the regulators of the process would allow for a better understanding of diseases that affect collagen fibril formation and assembly such as Ehlers-Danlos syndromes (EDS). On a broader spectrum, an understanding of the processes that lie behind fibrillogenesis would allow for great advancements in the field of regenerative medicine. A greater understanding would lead to a potential future in which organs and tissue damaged through trauma could be regenerated using the basis of collagen fibrillogenesis.
