= Tenascin =

Extracellular matrix glycoprotein family

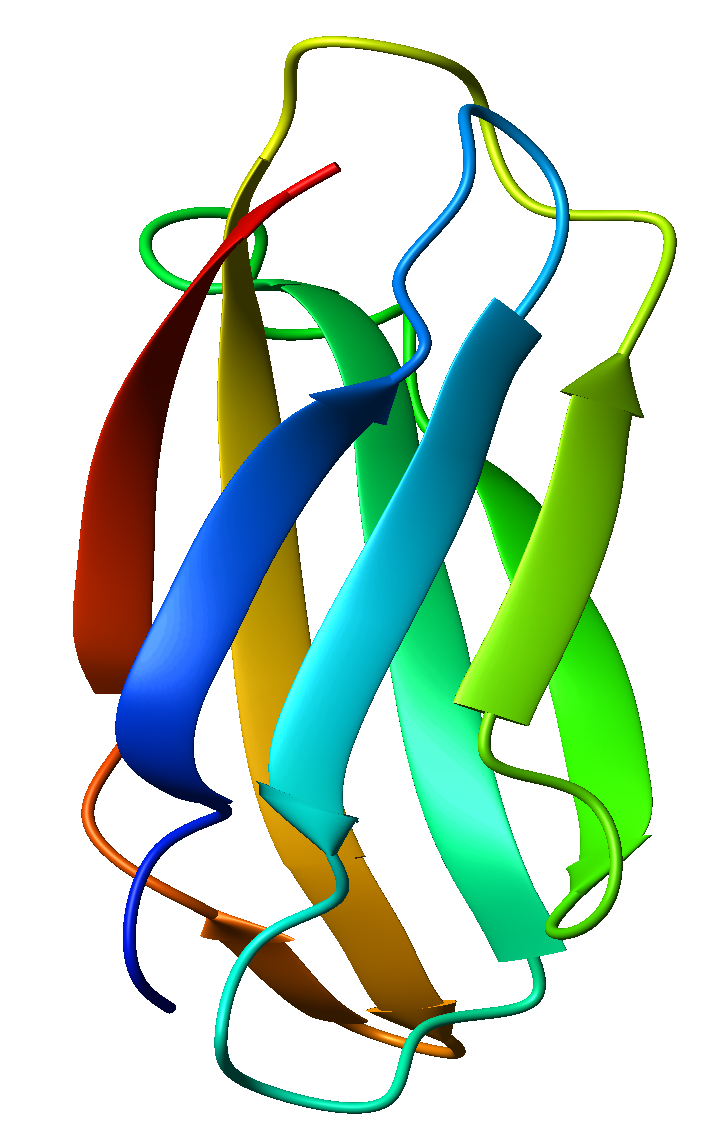
The fibronectin type III domain from human tenascin, colored from blue (N-terminus) to red (C-terminus)

Tenascins are extracellular matrix glycoproteins. They are abundant in the extracellular matrix of developing vertebrate embryos and they reappear around healing wounds and in the stroma of some tumors.

== Types ==
There are four members of the tenascin gene family: tenascin-C, tenascin-R, tenascin-X and tenascin-W.

- Tenascin-C is the founding member of the gene family. In the embryo it is made by migrating cells like the neural crest; it is also abundant in developing tendons, bone and cartilage.
- Tenascin-R is found in the developing and adult nervous system.
- Tenascin-X is found primarily in loose connective tissue; mutations in the human tenascin-X gene can lead to a form of Ehlers–Danlos syndrome.
- Tenascin-W is found in the kidney and in developing bone.

The basic structure is 14 EGF-like repeats towards the N-terminal end, and 8 or more fibronectin-III domains which vary upon species and variant.

Tenascin-C is the most intensely studied member of the family. It has anti-adhesive properties, causing cells in tissue culture to become rounded after it is added to the medium. One mechanism to explain this may come from its ability to bind to the extracellular matrix glycoprotein fibronectin and block fibronectin's interactions with specific syndecans. The expression of tenascin-C in the stroma of certain tumors is associated with a poor prognosis.
