= Tenascin C =

Human protein-coding gene

TNC
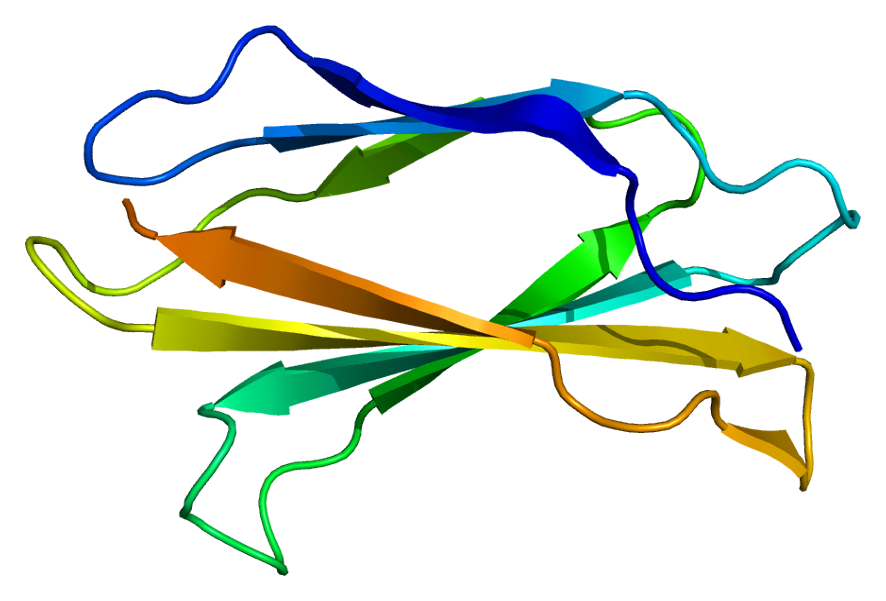

Identifiers
- Aliases: TNC, 150-225, DFNA56, GMEM, GP, HXB, JI, TN, TN-C, Tenascin C
- External IDs: OMIM: 187380; MGI: 101922; GeneCards: TNC
Available structures
PDB	Ortholog search: PDBe RCSB
PDB	List of PDB id codes 1TEN, 2RB8, 2RBL

Gene location (Human)
Chr.	Chromosome 9 (human)
Band	9q33.1	Start	115,019,575 bp
Band	9q33.1	End	115,118,257 bp

Gene location (Mouse)
Chr.	Chromosome 4 (mouse)
Band	4 C1|4 34.06 cM	Start	63,878,022 bp
Band	4 C1|4 34.06 cM	End	63,965,252 bp
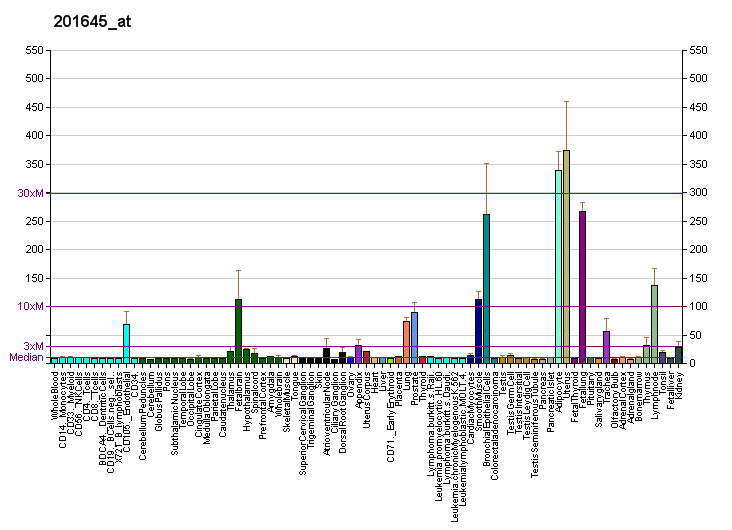
RNA expression pattern
Bgee	Human / Mouse (ortholog); Top expressed in: saphenous vein; tibial arteries; cartilage tissue; periodontal fiber; tibia; tendon of biceps brachii; mucosa of paranasal sinus; ventricular zone; pericardium; superficial temporal artery / Top expressed in: body of femur; molar; calvaria; maxillary part of mouth; facial skeleton; upper jaw; tibiofemoral joint; second toe; stroma of bone marrow; umbilical cord; More reference expression data
BioGPS	More reference expression data
Gene ontology
Molecular function	syndecan binding; extracellular matrix structural constituent; protein binding
Cellular component	interstitial matrix; membrane; focal adhesion; extracellular matrix; basement membrane; extracellular space; endoplasmic reticulum lumen; extracellular region; collagen-containing extracellular matrix; perisynaptic extracellular matrix
Biological process	cellular response to retinoic acid; negative regulation of cell adhesion; bud outgrowth involved in lung branching; mesenchymal-epithelial cell signaling involved in prostate gland development; response to fibroblast growth factor; response to mechanical stimulus; extracellular matrix organization; wound healing; cellular response to vitamin D; odontogenesis of dentin-containing tooth; positive regulation of gene expression; cell adhesion; prostate gland epithelium morphogenesis; cellular response to prostaglandin D stimulus; regulation of cell population proliferation; neuromuscular junction development; response to wounding; peripheral nervous system axon regeneration; osteoblast differentiation; positive regulation of cell population proliferation; response to ethanol; neuron projection development; post-translational protein modification
Sources:Amigo / QuickGO
Orthologs
Databases	NCBI: entry; OMA: entry
Species	Human	Mouse
Entrez	3371	21923
Ensembl	ENSG00000041982	ENSMUSG00000028364
UniProt	P24821	Q80YX1
RefSeq (mRNA)	NM_002160	NM_011607; NM_001369211; NM_001369212; NM_001369213; NM_001369214
RefSeq (protein)	NP_002151	NP_035737; NP_001356140; NP_001356141; NP_001356142; NP_001356143
Location (UCSC)	Chr 9: 115.02 – 115.12 Mb	Chr 4: 63.88 – 63.97 Mb
PubMed search
- Wikidata
View/Edit Human	View/Edit Mouse

Tenascin C (TN-C) is a glycoprotein that in humans is encoded by the TNC gene. It is expressed in the extracellular matrix of various tissues during development, disease or injury, and in restricted neurogenic areas of the central nervous system. Tenascin-C is the founding member of the tenascin protein family. In the embryo it is made by migrating cells like the neural crest; it is also abundant in developing tendons, bone and cartilage.

== Gene and expression ==
The human tenascin C gene, TN-C, is located on chromosome 9 with location of the cytogenic band at the 9q33. The entire Tenascin family coding region spans approximately 80 kilobases translating into 2203 amino acids.

Expression of TN-C changes from development to adulthood. TN-C is highly expressed during embryogenesis and is briefly expressed during organogenesis, while in developed organs, expression is absent or in trace amounts. TN-C has been shown to be upregulated under pathological conditions caused by inflammation, infection, tumorigenesis, and at sites that are subject to unique biomechanics forces.

The regulation of TN-C is induced or repressed by a number of different factors that are expressed during embryonic tissue, as well as developed tissues during remodeling, injured, or neoplastic. TGF-β1, tumor necrosis factor-α, interleukin-1, nerve growth factor, and keratinocyte growth factor are factors that have been shown to regulate TN-C. Other extracellular matrix components such as matrix metalloproteins and integrins are also frequently co-expressed with TN-C.

In the developing central nervous system, TN-C is involved in regulating the proliferation of both oligodendrocyte precursor cells and astrocytes. Expression of TN-C by radial glia precedes the onset of gliogenesis, during which time it is thought to drive the differentiation of astrocytes. In the adult brain, TN-C expression is downregulated except for the areas that maintain neurogenesis into adulthood and the hypothalamus. TN-C is also present in central nervous system injuries and gliomas.

== Structure ==
Tenascin C is an oligomeric glycoprotein composed of individual polypeptides with molecular weights ranging from 180 to ~300kDa. The Tenascin family of proteins shares a similar structural pattern. These similar modules include heptad repeats, EGF-like repeats, fibronectin type III domains, and a C-terminal globular domain shared with fibrinogens. These protein modules are lined up like beads on a string and give rise to long and extended molecules. At the N-terminus each Tenascin has an oligomerization domain which in the case of TN-C leads to the formation of hexamers. TN-C and -R are known to be subject to alternative splicing. In human TN-C there exists, in addition to the eight constant repeats, nine extra repeats subject to alternative splicing. This results in a multitude of TN-C subunits differing in the number and identity of fibronectin type III domain repeats.

== Interactions ==
Tenascin-C has been shown to interact with fibronectin. This interaction is shown to have the potential to modify cell adhesion. A solid-state interaction between fibronectin and TN-C results in cellular upregulation of matrix metalloproteinase expression.

TN-C also interacts with one or more TN-C receptors on cells which activate and repress the same signal transduction pathway. An example of this interaction is the adhesion of SW80 carcinoma cells to the third FN-III repeat of TN-C via the α_{v}β_{3} integrin receptor leads to cell spreading, phosphorylation of focal adhesion kinase, paxillin and ERK2 MAPK, and proliferation. In contrast, when these same cells use either α_{9}β_{1} or α_{v}β_{6} integrins to adhere to the same third FN type III repeat, cell spreading is attenuated and activation of these signaling mediators and cell growth is suppressed or fails to occur.

== Function ==
Tenascin C is a very diverse protein that can produce different functions within the same cell type. These myriad functions are accomplished through alternative splicing of mRNA as well as the temporal activation of signal transduction pathways and/or target genes at different stages of growth or differentiation. TN-C is classified as an adhesion-modulating protein, because it has been found to inhibit cellular adhesion to fibronectin.

Much of the functional studies are inferred from various TN-C knockout mice models. TN-C clearly plays a role in cell signaling as evidenced by its ability to be induced during events such as trauma, inflammation, or cancer development. Also, TN-C is important in regulating cell proliferation and migration, especially during developmental differentiation and wound healing.

== Clinical significance ==
Tenascin C continues to be researched as a potential biomarker for a number of diseases such as myocarditis and different forms of cancer. The numerous involvements with cellular functioning and signaling make TN-C a popular protein to study in developing new therapies and detection methods. Recent work has shown that TN-C inhibits HIV infection in immune cells by binding to a chemokine coreceptor site on the HIV-1 envelope protein, blocking the virus' entry into the host cells.

=== Role in cancer ===
Tenascin C is implicated in a number of different cancers such as osteosarcomas, chondrosarcomas, bladder cancer, and glioblastomas. In glioblastoma cells, Tenascin-C expression provides much clinical and functional significance in terms of cancer prognosis and tumor progression. The endogenous pool of tenascin-C isoforms in gliomas supports both tumor cell proliferation and migration. Because tenascin-C is essential to the survival of these various forms of cancers, tenascin-c expression could be a potential biomarker for cancer detection. Also, tenascin-C antibodies have been used to diagnose and create therapies for many different types of cancers.

== See also ==
- Tenascin
