= Thymus hyperplasia =

- Other names: Thymic hyperplasia
- Specialty: Immunology

Thymus hyperplasia refers to an enlargement ("hyperplasia") of the thymus.

It is not always a disease state. The size of the thymus usually peaks during adolescence and atrophies in the following decades. Before the immune function of the thymus was well understood, the enlargement was sometimes seen as a cause for alarm, and justification for surgical reduction. This approach is much less common today.

It can be associated with myasthenia gravis. Magnetic resonance imaging can be used to distinguish it from thymoma.

== Thymic hyperplasia ==
Thymic hyperplasia can be divided into three groups namely, those without any pre-existing medical condition, those recovering from a pre-existing medical condition such as pneumonia, corticosteroid therapy, radiation therapy, chemotherapy, surgery, and burns, and those with other disorders such as hyperthyroidism, juvenile myasthenia gravis, sarcoidosis, pure red cell aplasia.
