= MHC class III =

Group of proteins in vertebrates

MHC class III is a group of proteins belonging the class of major histocompatibility complex (MHC). Unlike other MHC types such as MHC class I and MHC class II, of which their structure and functions in immune response are well defined, MHC class III are poorly defined structurally and functionally. They are not involved in antigen binding (the process called antigen presentation, a classic function of MHC proteins). Only few of them are actually involved in immunity while many are signalling molecules in other cell communications. They are mainly known from their genes because their gene cluster is present between those of class I and class II. The gene cluster was discovered when genes (specifically those of complement components C2, C4, and factor B) were found in between class I and class II genes on the short (p) arm of human chromosome 6. It was later found that it contains many genes for different signaling molecules such as tumour necrosis factors (TNFs) and heat shock proteins. More than 60 MHC class III genes are described, which is about 28% of the total MHC genes (224). The region previously considered within MHC class III gene cluster that contains genes for TNFs is now known as MHC class IV or inflammatory region.

In contrast to other MHC proteins, MHC class III proteins are produced by liver cells (hepatocytes) and special white blood cells (macrophages), among others.

== Gene structure ==
MHC class III genes are located on chromosome 6 (6p21.3) in humans. It covers 700 kb and contains 61 genes. The gene cluster is the most gene-dense region of the human genome. They are basically similar with those of other animals. The functions of many genes are yet unknown. Many retroelements such as human endogenous retrovirus (HERV) and Alu elements are located in the cluster. The region containing genes WHR1(G11)/C4/Z/CYP21/X/Y, varying in size from 142 to 214 kb, is known as the most complex gene cluster in the human genome.

=== Diversity ===
MHC class III genes are similar in humans, mouse, frog (Xenopus tropicalis), and gray short-tailed opossum, but not all genes are common. For example, human NCR3, MIC and MCCD1 are absent in mouse. Human NCR3 and LST1 are absent in opossum. However, birds (chicken and quail) have only a single gene, which codes for a complement component gene (C4). In fishes, the genes are distributed in different chromosomes.
