= MHC class II =

Protein of the immune system

MHC Class II
- Schematic representation of MHC class II

Identifiers
- Symbol: MHC Class II
- Membranome: 63

MHC Class II molecules are a class of major histocompatibility complex (MHC) molecules normally found only on professional antigen-presenting cells such as dendritic cells, macrophages, some endothelial cells, thymic epithelial cells, and B cells. These cells are important in initiating immune responses.

Antigens presented by MHC class II molecules are exogenous, originating from extracellular proteins rather than cytosolic and endogenous sources like those presented by MHC class I.

The loading of a MHC class II molecule occurs by phagocytosis. Extracellular proteins are endocytosed into a phagosome, which subsequently fuses with a lysosome to create a phagolysosome. Within the phagolysosome, lysosomal enzymes degrade the proteins into peptide fragments. These fragments are then loaded into the peptide-binding groove of the MHC class II molecule. Once loaded, the MHC class II-peptide complexes are transported to the plasma membrane via vesicular transport, where they present the antigens to the extracellular environment.

In humans, the MHC class II protein complex is encoded by the human leukocyte antigen gene complex (HLA). Class II HLAs are composed of the classical HLA-DP, HLA-DQ, and HLA-DR and non-classical HLA-DM and HLA-DO MHC molecules.

Mutations in the HLA gene complex can lead to immunodeficiency disorders such as bare lymphocyte syndrome (BLS), which is a type of MHC class II deficiency.

== Structure ==
Like MHC class I molecules, class II molecules are also heterodimers, but in this case consist of two homogenous peptides, an α and β chain, both of which are encoded in the MHC. The subdesignation α1, α2, etc. refers to separate domains within the HLA gene; each domain is usually encoded by a different exon within the gene, and some genes have further domains that encode leader sequences, transmembrane sequences, etc. These molecules have both extracellular regions as well as a transmembrane sequence and a cytoplasmic tail. The α1 and β1 regions of the chains come together to make a membrane-distal peptide-binding domain, while the α2 and β2 regions, the remaining extracellular parts of the chains, form a membrane-proximal immunoglobulin-like domain. The antigen binding groove, where the antigen or peptide binds, is made up of two α-helixes walls and β-sheet.

Because the antigen-binding groove of MHC class II molecules is open at both ends while the corresponding groove on class I molecules is closed at each end, the antigens presented by MHC class II molecules are longer, generally between 15 and 24 amino acid residues long.

== Expression ==
These molecules are constitutively expressed in professional, immune antigen-presenting cells, but may also be induced on other cells by interferon γ. They are expressed on the epithelial cells in the thymus and on APCs in the periphery. MHC class II expression is closely regulated in APCs by CIITA, which is the MHC class II transactivator. CIITA is solely expressed on professional APCs; however, non-professional APCs can also regulate CIITA activity and MHC II expression. As mentioned interferon γ (IFN γ) triggers the expression of CIITA and is also responsible for converting monocytes which are MHC class II negative cells into functional APCs that express MHC class II on their surfaces.

MHC class II is also expressed on group 3 innate lymphoid cells.

== Importance ==
Having MHC class II molecules present proper peptides that are bound stably is essential for overall immune function. Because class II MHC is loaded with extracellular proteins, it is mainly concerned with presentation of extracellular pathogens (for example, bacteria that might be infecting a wound or the blood). Class II molecules interact mainly with immune cells, like the T helper cell (CD4^{+}). The peptide presented regulates how T cells respond to an infection. Stable peptide binding is essential to prevent detachment and degradation of a peptide, which could occur without secure attachment to the MHC molecule. This would prevent T cell recognition of the antigen, T cell recruitment, and a proper immune response. The triggered appropriate immune response may include localized inflammation and swelling due to recruitment of phagocytes or may lead to a full-force antibody immune response due to activation of B cells.

A review published in 2022 found that MHC Class IIA genes are understudied in evolutionary genetics. The same review also demonstrated, based on a metaanalysis of MHC Class II variation across 50 species of vertebrates, that MHC Class IIA genes harbor considerable levels of variation and appear to be targets of positive or diversifying selection in many species. The authors therefore argued that "it is conceptually important to incorporate MHC- IIA data into studies of pathogen-mediated selection, mate choice, and other aspects of ecology and evolution. The class II peptide binding groove is encoded by two types of genes, and it is time to consider them both to gain an integrative understanding of their functional importance"

== Synthesis ==
During synthesis of class II MHC in the endoplasmic reticulum, the α and β chains are produced and complexed with a special polypeptide known as the invariant chain. The nascent MHC class II protein in the rough ER has its peptide-binding cleft blocked by the invariant chain (Ii; a trimer) to prevent it from binding cellular peptides or peptides from the endogenous pathway (such as those that would be loaded onto class I MHC).

The invariant chain also facilitates the export of class II MHC from the ER to the Golgi apparatus, followed by fusion with a late endosome containing endocytosed, degraded proteins. The invariant chain is then broken down in stages by proteases called cathepsins, leaving only a small fragment known as CLIP which maintains blockage of the peptide binding cleft on the MHC molecule. A MHC class II-like structure, HLA-DM, facilitates CLIP removal and allows the binding of peptides with higher affinities. The stable class II MHC is then presented on the cell surface.

== Recycling of MHC class II complexes ==
After MHC class II complexes are synthesized and presented on APCs they are unable to be expressed on the cell surface indefinitely, due to the internalization of the plasma membrane by the APCs(antigen presenting cells). In some cells, antigens bind to recycled MHC class II molecules while they are in the early endosomes, while other cells such as dendritic cells internalize antigens via receptor-mediated endocytosis and create MHC class II molecules plus peptide in the endosomal-lysosomal antigen processing compartment which is independent of the synthesis of new MHC class II complexes. These suggest that after the antigen is internalized, already existent MHC class II complexes on mature dendritic cells can be recycled and developed into new MHC class II molecules plus peptide.

== Antigen processing and presentation ==
Unlike MHC I, MHC II is meant to present extracellular pathogens rather than intracellular. Furthermore, the first step is to acquire the pathogen through phagocytosis. The pathogen is then broken down in a lysosome and a desired component is then acquired and loaded onto a MHC II molecule. The MHC II molecule then travels to the surface to present the antigen to a helper T cell. MHC II activates helper T cells which help release cytokines and other things which will help induce other cells which help to combat the pathogens outside the cells.

== Genes ==
	Alpha	Beta
HLA-DP	HLA-DPA1	HLA-DPB1
HLA-DQ	HLA-DQA1, HLA-DQA2	HLA-DQB1, HLA-DQB2
HLA-DR	HLA-DRA	HLA-DRB1, HLA-DRB3, HLA-DRB4, HLA-DRB5
HLA-DM	HLA-DMA	HLA-DMB
HLA-DO	HLA-DOA	HLA-DOB

== Pathways controlling MHC class II antigen presentation ==
=== Pathway: PSD4–ARL14/ARF7–MYO1E ===
==== Molecules involved ====
Several molecules are involved in this pathway.

- PIK3R2 and PIP5K1A are two kinases that create substrates for PSD4.
- PSD4 (Pleckstrin and Sec7 Domain containing 4) is a GEF (Guanine nucleotide Exchange Factor) that loads ARL14/ARF7 with GTP.
- ARL14/ARF7 is a Small GTPase protein that is selectively expressed in immune cells. This protein is localized within MHC-II compartments in immature dendritic cells.
- ARF7EP is an effector of ARL14/ARF7 that interacts with MYO1E.
- MYO1E is a protein that controls MHC-II compartments with an actin-based mechanism.

==== Pathway ====
PIK3R2 and PIP5K1A are two kinases that phosphorylate Phosphatidylinositol (PIP) providing PSD4 with substrates for its GTP loading ability. PSD4 as a guanine exchange factor, loads ARL14/ARF7 with GTP. Subsequently, ARF7EP interacts with MYO1E which binds itself to actin myofibers. Altogether, this complex contributes to maintain MHC-II loaded vesicles within the immature dendritic cell, impeding its translocation to the cell membrane.

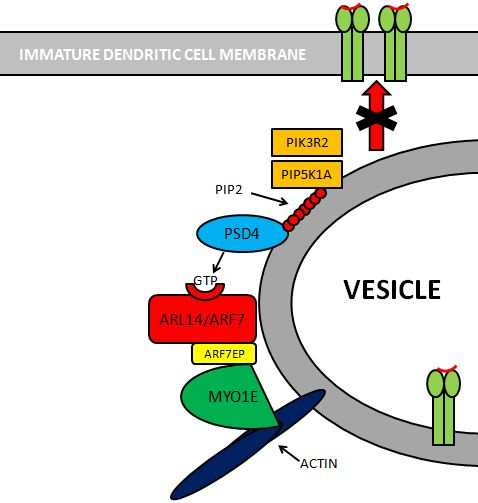
Pathway showing how MHC-II distribution is controlled within Immature Dendritic Cells.

== Bare lymphocyte syndrome ==
One type of MHC class II deficiency, also called bare lymphocyte syndrome, is due to mutations in the genes that code for transcription factors that regulate the expression of the MHC class II genes. It results in the depletion of CD4 T cells and some immunoglobulin isotypes even though there are normal levels of both CD8 T cells and B cells present. Deficient MHC class II molecules are unable to present antigens to T cells and properly activate T cells. T cells are then unable to proliferate and secrete cytokines which normally participate in the immune response. Not only do the deficient MHC class II molecules affect the activation and proliferation of T cells but also the rest of the immune response cascade which includes B cells. Therefore, with this decrease in the number of T cells, the T cells cannot interact and activate the B cells. Normally when B cells are activated they divide, proliferate and differentiate, which includes the differentiation of these cells into plasma cells which are responsible for producing antibodies. However, when there is a deficiency in MHC class II molecules B cells are not activated and cannot differentiate into plasma cells which causes them to be deficient in antibodies which are unable to perform as they are expected. The only current form of treatment is a bone-marrow transplant; however, even this does not cure the disease and most patients do not live past age ten.

== MHC class II and Type I diabetes ==
MHC class II genes and molecules are related to a multitude of different diseases, one of which being Type I diabetes. HLA class II genes are the most important genes associated with the risk of inheriting Type I diabetes, accounting for about 40-50% of heritability. Alleles of these genes that affect peptide binding to the MHC class II molecules seem to impact Type I diabetes risk the most. Specific allele polymorphisms have been identified to increase the risk (such as DRB1 and DQB1). Others have been associated with a resistance to the disease.

== See also ==
- Cross-presentation
- Bare lymphocyte syndrome
