= HLA-DRA =

Protein-coding gene in the species Homo sapiens

Identifiers
- Aliases: HLA-DRA, HLA-DRA1, MLRW, major histocompatibility complex, class II, DR alpha
- External IDs: OMIM: 142860; MGI: 95900; GeneCards: HLA-DRA
Available structures
PDB	Ortholog search: PDBe RCSB
PDB	List of PDB id codes 1A6A, 1AQD, 1BX2, 1D5M, 1D5X, 1D5Z, 1D6E, 1DLH, 1FV1, 1FYT, 1H15, 1HXY, 1J8H, 1JWM, 1JWS, 1JWU, 1KG0, 1KLG, 1KLU, 1LO5, 1PYW, 1R5I, 1SEB, 1SJE, 1SJH, 1T5W, 1T5X, 1YMM, 1ZGL, 2FSE, 2G9H, 2IAM, 2IAN, 2ICW, 2IPK, 2OJE, 2Q6W, 2WBJ, 2XN9, 3C5J, 3L6F, 3O6F, 3PDO, 3PGC, 3PGD, 3QXA, 3QXD, 3S4S, 3S5L, 3T0E, 4AEN, 4AH2, 4E41, 4FQX, 4GBX, 4H1L, 4C56, 4H25, 4H26, 4I5B, 4IS6, 4MCY, 4MCZ, 4MD0, 4MD4, 4MD5, 4MDI, 4MDJ, 4OV5, 4Y19, 4Y1A, 4X5X, 4X5W

Gene location (Human)
Chr.	Chromosome 6 (human)
Band	6p21.32	Start	32,439,878 bp
Band	6p21.32	End	32,445,046 bp
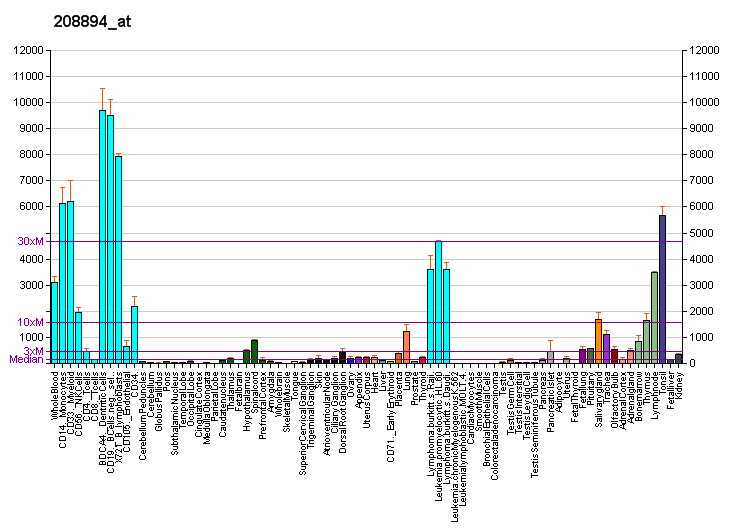
RNA expression pattern
Bgee	Human / Mouse (ortholog); Top expressed in: monocyte; appendix; lymph node; granulocyte; gallbladder; duodenum; spleen; upper lobe of left lung; right lung; smooth muscle tissue / n/a; More reference expression data
BioGPS	More reference expression data
Gene ontology
Molecular function	peptide antigen binding; MHC class II receptor activity; MHC class II protein complex binding; protein binding
Cellular component	integral component of membrane; endocytic vesicle membrane; clathrin-coated endocytic vesicle membrane; endosome; Golgi apparatus; trans-Golgi network membrane; endoplasmic reticulum membrane; membrane; late endosome membrane; Golgi membrane; plasma membrane; transport vesicle membrane; integral component of plasma membrane; cell surface; lysosomal membrane; endoplasmic reticulum; ER to Golgi transport vesicle membrane; lysosome; integral component of lumenal side of endoplasmic reticulum membrane; endosome membrane; extracellular exosome; MHC class II protein complex
Biological process	antigen processing and presentation; antigen processing and presentation of exogenous peptide antigen via MHC class II; cognition; interferon-gamma-mediated signaling pathway; immune system process; T cell costimulation; antigen processing and presentation of peptide or polysaccharide antigen via MHC class II; immune response; peptide antigen assembly with MHC class II protein complex; viral process; T cell receptor signaling pathway; adaptive immune response
Sources:Amigo / QuickGO
Orthologs
Databases	NCBI: entry; OMA: entry
Species	Human	Mouse
Entrez	3122	100504404
Ensembl	ENSG00000206308; ENSG00000228987; ENSG00000230726; ENSG00000204287; ENSG00000227993 ENSG00000226260; ENSG00000234794; ENSG00000277263	ENSMUSG00000036322
UniProt	P01903	P04224; P01904
RefSeq (mRNA)	NM_019111	NM_010381
RefSeq (protein)	NP_061984	NP_034511
Location (UCSC)	Chr 6: 32.44 – 32.45 Mb	n/a
PubMed search
- Wikidata
View/Edit Human	View/Edit Mouse

HLA class II histocompatibility antigen, DR alpha chain is a protein that in humans is encoded by the HLA-DRA gene. HLA-DRA encodes the alpha subunit of HLA-DR. Unlike the alpha chains of other Human MHC class II molecules, the alpha subunit is practically invariable. However it can pair with, in any individual, the beta chain from 3 different DR beta loci, DRB1, and two of any DRB3, DRB4, or DRB5 alleles. Thus there is the potential that any given individual can form 4 different HLA-DR isoforms (2 alleles of DRB1 and two alleles from DRB3, DRB4 or DRB5).

== Function ==
The polypeptide subunit encoded by this gene belongs to the HLA class II alpha chain paralogues. The class II protein is a heterodimer consisting of an alpha (DRα) and a beta chain (DRβ), both anchored in the membrane. It plays a central role in the immune system by presenting peptides derived from extracellular proteins. Class II molecules are expressed in antigen presenting cells (APC: B lymphocytes, dendritic cells, macrophages).

== Gene structure and polymorphisms ==
The alpha chain is approximately 33-35 kDa and its gene contains 5 exons. Exon 1 encodes the leader peptide, exons 2 and 3 encode the two extracellular domains, and exon 4 encodes the transmembrane domain and the cytoplasmic tail. DRA does not have polymorphisms in the peptide binding part and acts as the sole alpha chain for DRB1, DRB3, DRB4 and DRB5.

== Alleles ==
There are two different HLA-DRA chains in the human population coded by three different DRA alleles:

DRA*01:01
DRA*01:02:01
DRA*01:02:02

== See also ==
- HLA-DR
