= HLA-DO =

Major Histocompatibility Complex, Class II, DO alpha

Identifiers
- Symbol: HLA-DOA
- Alt. symbols: HLA-DZA, HLA-DNA
- NCBI gene: 3111
- HGNC: 4936
- OMIM: 142930
- RefSeq: NM_002119
- UniProt: Q9TQD3

Other data
- Locus: Chr. 6 p21.3
Search for
- Structures: Swiss-model
- Domains: InterPro

Major Histocompatibility Complex, Class II, DO beta

Identifiers
- Symbol: HLA-DOB
- NCBI gene: 3112
- HGNC: 4937
- OMIM: 600629
- RefSeq: NM_002120
- UniProt: P13765

Other data
- Locus: Chr. 6 p21.3
Search for
- Structures: Swiss-model
- Domains: InterPro

Human leukocyte histocompatibility complex DO (HLA-DO) is an intracellular, dimeric non-classical major histocompatibility complex (MHC) class II protein composed of α- and β-subunits which interact with HLA-DM in order to fine tune immunodominant epitope selection. As a non-classical MHC class II molecule, HLA-DO is a non-polymorphic accessory protein that aids in antigenic peptide chaperoning and loading, as opposed to its classical counterparts, which are polymorphic and involved in antigen presentation. Though more remains to be elucidated about the function of HLA-DO, its unique distribution in the mammalian body—namely, the exclusive expression of HLA-DO in B cells, thymic medullary epithelial cells, and dendritic cells—indicate that it may be of physiological importance and has inspired further research. Although HLA-DM can be found without HLA-DO, HLA-DO is only found in complex with HLA-DM and exhibits instability in the absence of HLA-DM. The evolutionary conservation of both DM and DO, further denote its biological significance and potential to confer evolutionary benefits to its host.

== Discovery ==
Studies on HLA-DO transfected fibroblast cells lines and on the HLA-DO mouse homolog, H-2O, provide most of the current knowledge on the protein. In 1985, the α- and β-chains were separately discovered, and in 1990, both chains were found to be co-expressed in one protein in H-2O. In contrast to other molecules of MHC class II, interferon gamma does not induce HLA-DO expression.

== Function ==
During infection, exogenous antigen is internalized by phagocytosis or receptor-mediated endocytosis, and processed in hydrolytic enzyme-containing compartments of increasing acidity. To bind to the MHC-class II protein, HLA-DM catalyzes the exchange of CLIP, a protein occupying the binding groove of MHC class II, with the antigenic oligopeptide. HLA-DO is strongly associated with HLA-DM throughout the catalyzed exchange. HLA-DM also plays a role in causing conformational changes in the MHC II groove leading to the release of poor fitting, or "DM-sensitive", peptides to encourage the presentation of higher affinity peptides.

Unlike classical MHC II proteins, but like HLA-DM, HLA-DO does not bind processed oligopeptides of antigen. Rather, HLA-DO binds a fellow non-classical MHC II protein HLA-DM at the MHC class II at the peptide-exchange catalysis site suggesting that it acts as a regulator of sorts. Further suggesting the tangential function of DO and DM, the movement of DO from the endoplasmic reticulum to the site of MHC II processing is completely dependent on the association of DO with DM.

Recent studies into the mechanisms of the less studied HLA-DO suggest that it may work in regulatory fashion on the ability of HLA-DM to choose immunodominant epitopes presented in the thymus. An in vivo study using mice with an HLA-DO knockout lead to an increased disposition for self-reactive immune disease. Research suggests that this may be due to a lack of HLA-DO as a regulator of HLA-DM as a DO knockout leads to less diversity in the MHC II binding as only HLA-DM insensitive peptides will remain bound to the groove. Similarly, HLA-DO is expressed in B cells as well which indicates the possibility of fine tuning the ability of B cells to present a variety of immunodominant epitopes, as opposed to only well fitting peptides unaffected by DM.

== Structure ==
Before the three-dimensional structure of complexed HLA-DO was elucidated by X-ray crystallography, its crystal structure was modeled after homology studies to classical MHC class II proteins. Following crystallization of the protein, HLA-DO was found to be conformationally similar to classical MHC class II protein, with alterations in the N-terminus. The structure of the free HLA-DO protein, however, remains to be elucidated.
