= David Sacks (disambiguation) =

David Sacks may refer to:

- David O. Sacks (born 1972), South African-born American entrepreneur
- David Sacks (writer), American writer

== See also ==
- David Sachs, American immunologist
