= WIPF1 =

Protein-coding gene in the species Homo sapiens

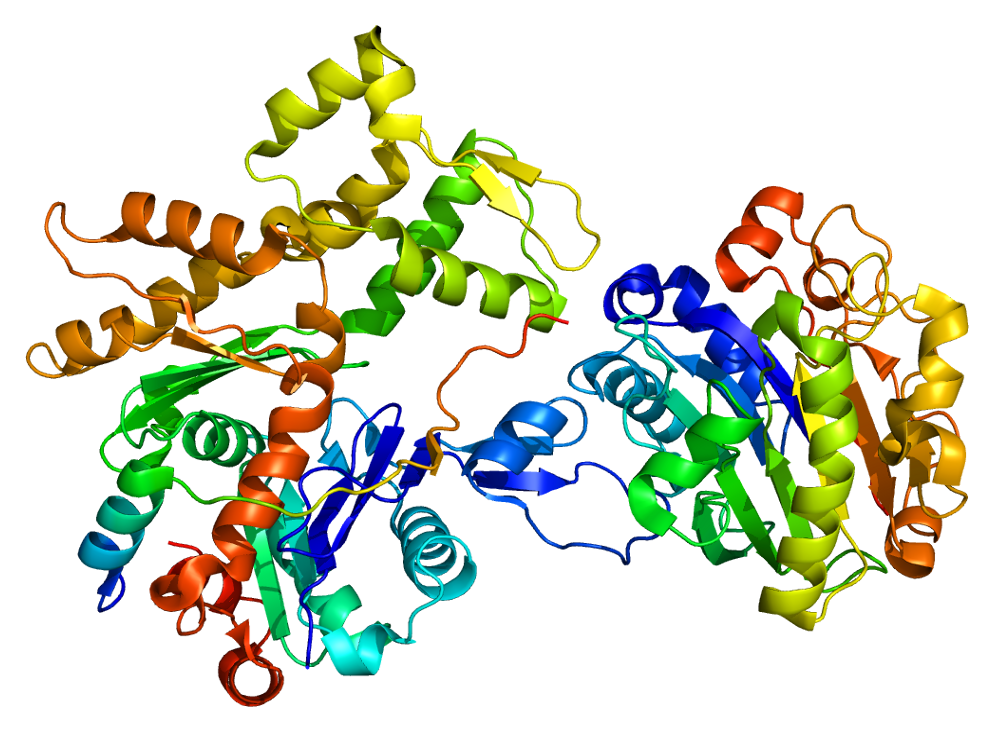

Identifiers
- Aliases: WIPF1, PRPL-2, WASPIP, WIP, WAS2, WAS/WASL interacting protein family member 1
- External IDs: OMIM: 602357; MGI: 2178801; GeneCards: WIPF1
Available structures
PDB	Ortholog search: PDBe RCSB
PDB	List of PDB id codes 2A41

Gene location (Human)
Chr.	Chromosome 2 (human)
Band	2q31.1	Start	174,559,572 bp
Band	2q31.1	End	174,682,916 bp

Gene location (Mouse)
Chr.	Chromosome 2 (mouse)
Band	2 C3|2 43.68 cM	Start	73,259,954 bp
Band	2 C3|2 43.68 cM	End	73,360,078 bp
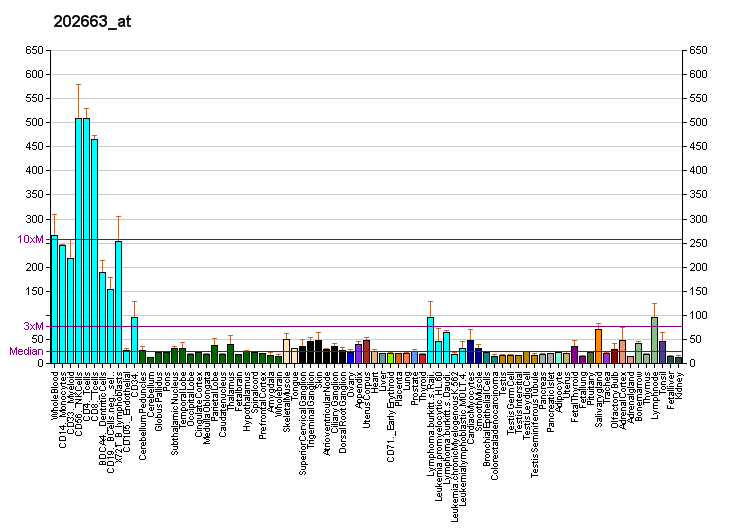

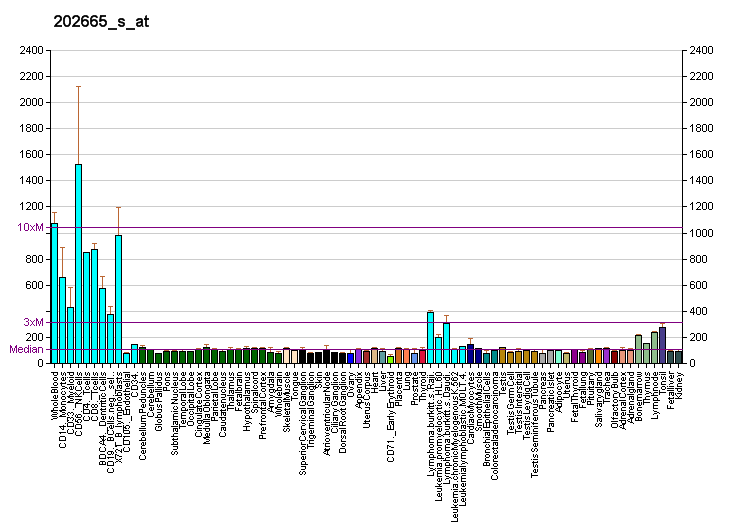

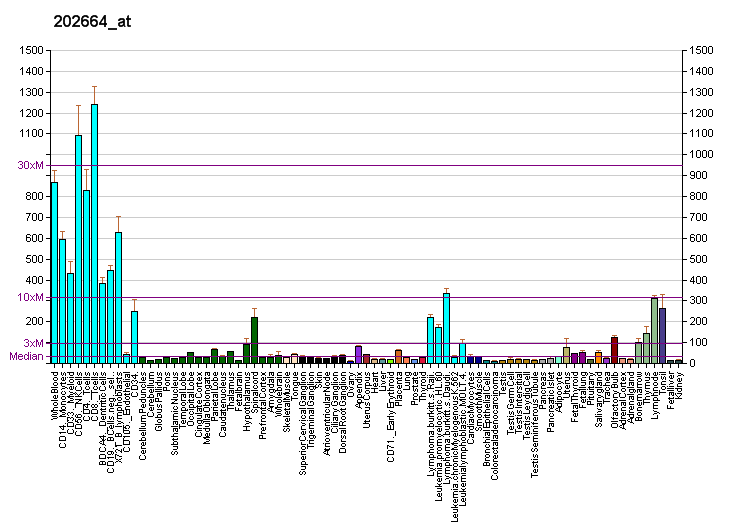
RNA expression pattern
Bgee	Human / Mouse (ortholog); Top expressed in: blood; monocyte; appendix; lymph node; bone marrow cell; trabecular bone; granulocyte; periodontal fiber; tibia; inferior ganglion of vagus nerve / Top expressed in: granulocyte; mesenteric lymph nodes; spleen; blood; thymus; sciatic nerve; aortic valve; ascending aorta; body of femur; stroma of bone marrow; More reference expression data
BioGPS	More reference expression data
Gene ontology
Molecular function	actin binding; profilin binding; protein binding; SH3 domain binding; actin filament binding
Cellular component	actin cytoskeleton; cytoplasm; cytosol; cell projection; ruffle; cytoskeleton; cytoplasmic vesicle; actin filament; actin cortical patch
Biological process	actin polymerization or depolymerization; Fc-gamma receptor signaling pathway involved in phagocytosis; response to other organism; actin filament-based movement; protein-containing complex assembly; actin cortical patch assembly; endocytosis; positive regulation of actin nucleation; actin cortical patch localization
Sources:Amigo / QuickGO
Orthologs
Databases	NCBI: entry; OMA: entry
Species	Human	Mouse
Entrez	7456	215280
Ensembl	ENSG00000115935	ENSMUSG00000075284
UniProt	O43516	Q8K1I7
RefSeq (mRNA)	NM_001077269; NM_003387	NM_001289722; NM_001289723; NM_153138
RefSeq (protein)	NP_001070737; NP_003378; NP_001362761; NP_001362762; NP_001362763 NP_001362764; NP_001362765; NP_001362766; NP_001362767; NP_001362768	NP_001276651; NP_001276652; NP_694778
Location (UCSC)	Chr 2: 174.56 – 174.68 Mb	Chr 2: 73.26 – 73.36 Mb
PubMed search
- Wikidata
View/Edit Human	View/Edit Mouse

WAS/WASL-interacting protein (WIP) is a protein that in humans is encoded by the WIPF1 gene.

== Gene ==
Two transcript variants encoding the same protein have been identified for this gene.

== Function ==
This gene encodes a protein that plays an important role in the organization of the actin cytoskeleton. Overexpression of WIP in mammalian cells has been shown to increase actin polymerization.

== Clinical significance ==
The encoded protein binds to a region of Wiskott–Aldrich syndrome protein (WASp) that is frequently mutated in Wiskott–Aldrich syndrome, an X-linked recessive disorder. Impairment of the interaction between these two proteins may contribute to the disease.

In patients lacking the WIPF1 gene, WASp protein levels are depleted and WAS symptoms present.

== Interactions ==
WIP has been shown to interact with Wiskott–Aldrich syndrome protein, N-WASp, Cortactin, NCK1, MYO1e and ITSN1. While Wiskott–Aldrich syndrome protein is expressed only in haematopoetic cells, WIPF1 is expressed ubiquitously. The majority of the mutations causing Wiskott Aldrich Syndrome are located in the WH1 domain of WASp. These mutations affect WASp-WIPF1 binding. WIPF1 has an N-terminal profilin binding domain, two actin binding WH2 domains, a central polyproline stretch, and a C-terminal WASp Binding Domain. WASp protein is degraded in the absence of WIP; but the ubiquitously expressed WASp ortholog N-WASp remains stable in the absence of WIP.

== Work in yeast ==
WIPF1 functions and interactions have been studied in multiple fungal systems including Saccharomyces cerevisiae, Schizosaccharomyces pombe, Candida albicans, and Magnaporthe grisea.

Yeast Vrp1 is recruited to sites of endocytosis by WASp homologs. Here it interacts with myosin-1 and enhances myosin-1 mediated activation of the Arp2/3 complex. In addition to a role in endocytosis, Saccharomyces cerevisiae Vrp1 functions in cytokinesis and cell polarization.

In Schizosaccharomyces pombe, Vrp1 interaction with myosin-1 is believed to help position new actin branches near the membrane, enhancing the amount of force against the membrane. This interaction is disrupted by the yeast specific protein Bbc1/Mti1/SPAC23A1.17, which competes with Vrp1 for binding the Myo1e homolog.
