= Un-25 =

Fungus genes

60S ribosomal protein L13

Identifiers
- Organism: Neurospora crassa OR74A
- Symbol: un-25
- Alt. symbols: NCU05554
- Entrez: 3876663
- HomoloGene: 5568
- RefSeq (mRNA): XM_955423.3
- RefSeq (Prot): XP_960516.1
- UniProt: Q7S709

Other data
- Chromosome: CM002241: 1.53 - 1.54 Mb
Search for
- Structures: Swiss-model
- Domains: InterPro

un-25 is a gene in Neurospora crassa, encode a fungus ortholog of the human 60S ribosomal protein L13, is the structural constituent of ribosome.

== See also ==
- Un-24
