= HLA-DQA2 =

Protein-coding gene in the species Homo sapiens

Identifiers
- Aliases: HLA-DQA2, DX-ALPHA, HLA-DXA, HLA-DQA2 (gene), major histocompatibility complex, class II, DQ alpha 2, DC-alpha, HLA-DCA, DQA1
- External IDs: OMIM: 613503; MGI: 95895; GeneCards: HLA-DQA2

Gene location (Human)
Chr.	Chromosome 6 (human)
Band	6p21.32	Start	32,741,391 bp
Band	6p21.32	End	32,747,198 bp

Gene location (Mouse)
Chr.	Chromosome 17 (mouse)
Band	17 B1|17 17.98 cM	Start	34,501,718 bp
Band	17 B1|17 17.98 cM	End	34,506,797 bp
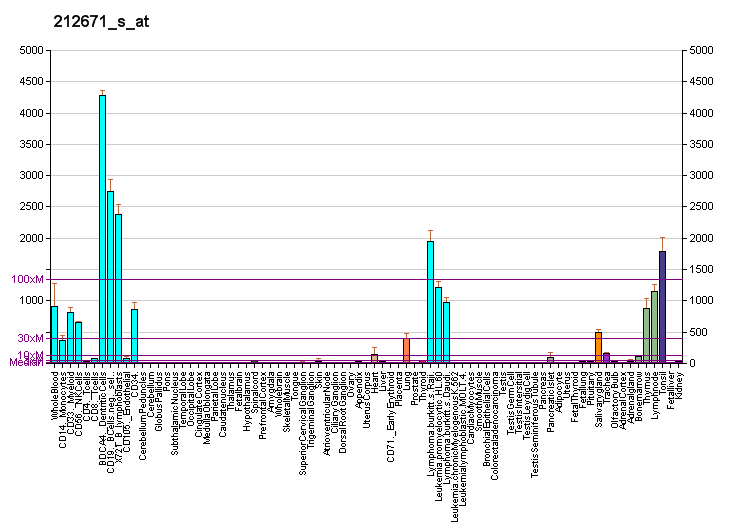
RNA expression pattern
Bgee	Human / Mouse (ortholog); Top expressed in: granulocyte; appendix; testicle; lymph node; duodenum; spleen; right coronary artery; upper lobe of left lung; right lung; mucosa of transverse colon / Top expressed in: spleen; mesenteric lymph nodes; Paneth cell; thymus; submandibular gland; right lung; right lung lobe; tunica adventitia of aorta; skin of external ear; superior surface of tongue; More reference expression data
BioGPS	More reference expression data
Gene ontology
Molecular function	MHC class II receptor activity
Cellular component	integral component of membrane; endocytic vesicle membrane; clathrin-coated endocytic vesicle membrane; endosome; Golgi apparatus; trans-Golgi network membrane; endoplasmic reticulum membrane; membrane; Golgi membrane; plasma membrane; transport vesicle membrane; integral component of plasma membrane; MHC class II protein complex; lysosomal membrane; endoplasmic reticulum; ER to Golgi transport vesicle membrane; lysosome; integral component of lumenal side of endoplasmic reticulum membrane; endosome membrane
Biological process	antigen processing and presentation; antigen processing and presentation of exogenous peptide antigen via MHC class II; interferon-gamma-mediated signaling pathway; immune system process; antigen processing and presentation of peptide or polysaccharide antigen via MHC class II; immune response; T cell receptor signaling pathway; adaptive immune response
Sources:Amigo / QuickGO
Orthologs
Databases	NCBI: entry; OMA: entry
Species	Human	Mouse
Entrez	3118	14960
Ensembl	ENSG00000231823; ENSG00000206301; ENSG00000257473; ENSG00000231526; ENSG00000225103 ENSG00000237541; ENSG00000223793; ENSG00000233192	ENSMUSG00000036594
UniProt	P01906	P14434; P14437; P01910; P14435; P14438 P04228; P14436; P04227
RefSeq (mRNA)	NM_020056	NM_010378
RefSeq (protein)	NP_064440	NP_034508
Location (UCSC)	Chr 6: 32.74 – 32.75 Mb	Chr 17: 34.5 – 34.51 Mb
PubMed search
- Wikidata
View/Edit Human	View/Edit Mouse

HLA class II histocompatibility antigen, DQ(6) alpha chain is a protein that in humans is encoded by the HLA-DQA2 gene. Also known as HLA-DXA or DAAP-381D23.2, it is part of the human leukocyte antigen system.

The protein encoded by this gene is expressed, but unlike HLA-DQA1, it is apparently unable to heterodimerize with HLA class II beta chain paralogues. The low level of HLA-DQA2 expression is apparently due to impaired transcription factor binding to the HLA-DQA2 gene promoter.

== COVID-19 ==
Transcriptome analysis of blood immune cells and nasopharyngeal cells before elaborate infection of study participants revealed that heightened expression of HLA-DQA2 correlates to a significantly lower chance of COVID-19 successfully infecting the individual.
