= David Sachs =

American immunologist

David Howard Sachs
- Born: January 10, 1942 (age 84); New York, NY, US
- Education: Harvard Medical School; Harvard College; University of Paris
- Known for: Discovery of MHC class II; First clinical protocol for the induction of transplantation tolerance
- Awards: Thomas Starzl Prize (2012); Medawar Prize (2014)
- Scientific career
- Fields: Transplantation Xenotransplantation
- Workplaces: Massachusetts General Hospital; Harvard Medical School; Columbia University Medical Center

David Howard Sachs (born January 10, 1942) is an American immunologist. He is best known for his discovery of MHC class II and for his seminal studies in the fields of transplant immune tolerance and xenotransplantation.

== Education ==
David Sachs graduated summa cum laude in organic chemistry from Harvard College in 1963, and pursued a master's degree equivalent at the University of Paris on a Fulbright Fellowship in 1964. He then matriculated to Harvard Medical School, where he graduated magna cum laude in 1968.

== Research ==
As a medical student, Sachs developed an interest in transplantation and joined the laboratory of Drs. Paul Russell and Henry Winn at the Massachusetts General Hospital, where he remained as a surgical resident until 1970. From 1970 to 1972 Sachs fulfilled his military service working in Christian Anfinsen's laboratory at the National Institutes of Health. He remained in Bethesda and joined the National Cancer Institute, where his research led to the discovery of class II MHC in 1973. He was then appointed director of the Transplantation Biology Section of the Immunology Branch at NCI in 1974, and Chief of the Immunology Branch in 1982.

In 1991 Sachs returned to Boston, where he was appointed Professor of Surgery at Massachusetts General Hospital and Harvard Medical School. At MGH Sachs further developed his research in the field of transplantation tolerance. In the 1980s Sachs had shown that mixed-chimerism can lead to transplant tolerance in small animal models; these findings were then confirmed in a large animal model during Sachs' tenure at Harvard. Based on these observations, Sachs and his colleagues at Massachusetts General Hospital developed the first clinical protocol for the induction of organ transplantation tolerance in the early 2000s.
