= Un-24 =

Ribonucleoside-diphosphate reductase large chain

Identifiers
- Organism: Neurospora crassa OR74A
- Symbol: un-24
- Alt. symbols: NCU03539
- Entrez: 3872956
- HomoloGene: 806
- RefSeq (mRNA): XM_951725.3
- RefSeq (Prot): XP_956818.1
- UniProt: Q19K46

Other data
- EC number: 1.17.4.1
- Chromosome: CM002237: 0.31 - 0.32 Mb
Search for
- Structures: Swiss-model
- Domains: InterPro

un-24 is a gene in fungus such as Neurospora crassa, encode Ribonucleoside-diphosphate reductase large chain, involved in their heterokaryon incompatibility.

== See also ==
- Un-25
