= Anti-IgLON5 disease =

- Specialty: Neurology, Immunology
- Frequency: 0.0001%

Anti-IgLON5 disease is an uncommon neurological autoimmune condition linked to autoantibodies directed against the IgLON5 protein. Sleep disturbance, bulbar symptoms, and abnormal gait make up the majority of the clinical presentation, which is then followed by cognitive dysfunction. The diagnosis of anti-IgLON5 disease is primarily based on clinical signs and the identification of IgLON5 antibodies in patient serum and/or cerebrospinal fluid.

== Mechanism ==
The IgLON proteins are a family of five cell-adhesion molecules IgLON 1, 2, 3, 4 & 5, which assist in neuronal growth and connections among nerve cells. and help in brain evolution and maturation to maintain integrity of the blood brain barrier.

Abnormal pTau deposits seen in several brains, brain stems and upper cervical cords shown by neuro-immuno-histochemistry studies of brain tissue from these regions without inflammatory cells differentiate this entity from other autoimmune encephalitis.

IgLON5 refers to a cell surface protein involved in promoting connections among nerve cells. Prevalence of the HLA-DRB1*10:01 allele was greatly increased in people with anti-IgLON5 disease. The sleep problems seen in this disorder are insomnia, sleep related abnormal movements called parasomnias which may be seen in both REM and NREM sleep and poor efficiency of sleep. Respiratory problems related to sleep disorder such as obstructive sleep apnea (OSA) and jerky stertorous breathing were noted in more than half the cases.

== Diagnosis ==
Serum studies show IgLON5 antibodies in almost all patients while the presence of CSF antibodies is more sporadic, occurring in ~50% of cases. Additional findings may be Oligoclonal bands(OCB), a few leukocytes and a slight rise in proteins, with otherwise normal CSF examination in more than half the cases.

== Genetics and hereditary risk ==
Anti-IgLON5 disease is not considered a hereditary disorder. Instead, it is classified as an autoimmune disease in which the immune system produces antibodies against the neuronal cell adhesion molecule IgLON5.

Studies have shown a strong association with specific human leukocyte antigen (HLA) types, particularly HLA-DRB1*10:01 and HLA-DQB1*05:01 alleles, suggesting a role for genetic susceptibility in disease development.

However, these HLA alleles are not disease-causing on their own, and the presence of such genetic markers in family members does not predict disease occurrence. To date, no familial clustering or inherited cases have been reported. As such, routine genetic or antibody testing of relatives is not recommended unless symptoms develop.

== Treatment ==
Anti-IgLON5 disease is mainly treated with immunosuppressants (80%), mostly cycles of IV corticosteroids (58%) in combination with IV immunoglobulins (IVIg−36%) and/or TPE (27%). Alternative successfully used, second-line treatments are Rituximab (22%) and Cyclophosphamide (12%), Azathioprine and Mycophenolate Mofetil.

Sudden death is the most common outcome in nearly 34% of patients, irrespective of partial response to therapy. While complications from aspiration were the other common cause of death.

Symptomatic treatment with CPAP in patients with OSA helps improve respiratory symptoms, while parasomnias and movement disorders (myoclonus, parkinsonism, and dystonia) did not respond when antiepileptic, dopaminergic, and anti-hyperkinetic drugs were administered.
