= IGLON5 =

Human protein-coding gene

Identifiers
- Aliases: IGLON5, IgLON family member 5
- External IDs: MGI: 2686277; GeneCards: IGLON5

Gene location (Human)
Chr.	Chromosome 19 (human)
Band	19q13.41	Start	51,311,644 bp
Band	19q13.41	End	51,330,891 bp

Gene location (Mouse)
Chr.	Chromosome 7 (mouse)
Band	7|7 B3	Start	43,122,328 bp
Band	7|7 B3	End	43,139,499 bp
RNA expression pattern
Bgee	Human / Mouse (ortholog); Top expressed in: ganglionic eminence; right hemisphere of cerebellum; pons; ventricular zone; lateral nuclear group of thalamus; hypothalamus; superior vestibular nucleus; right frontal lobe; cingulate gyrus; anterior cingulate cortex / Top expressed in: neural layer of retina; cerebellar cortex; lumbar subsegment of spinal cord; ventricular zone; primary visual cortex; superior frontal gyrus; ganglionic eminence; dentate gyrus of hippocampal formation granule cell; medial vestibular nucleus; pontine nuclei; More reference expression data
BioGPS	n/a
Orthologs
Databases	NCBI: entry; OMA: entry
Species	Human	Mouse
Entrez	402665	210094
Ensembl	ENSG00000142549	ENSMUSG00000013367
UniProt	A6NGN9	Q8HW98
RefSeq (mRNA)	NM_001101372	NM_001164518
RefSeq (protein)	NP_001094842	NP_001157990
Location (UCSC)	Chr 19: 51.31 – 51.33 Mb	Chr 7: 43.12 – 43.14 Mb
PubMed search
- Wikidata
View/Edit Human	View/Edit Mouse

IgLON family member 5 (IgLON5) is a cell adhesion molecule encoded in humans by the IGLON5 gene. It belongs to the IgLON family within the immunoglobulin superfamily.

== Structure ==
IgLON5 has three extracellular immunoglobulin-like domains and is attached to the cell membrane by a glycosylphosphatidylinositol anchor.

== Function ==
IgLON5 can interact with itself and with other IgLON proteins. Its physiological functions remain incompletely understood.

== Clinical significance ==
Autoantibodies against IgLON5 are associated with anti-IgLON5 disease, a neurological disorder.
