= CLIP (protein) =

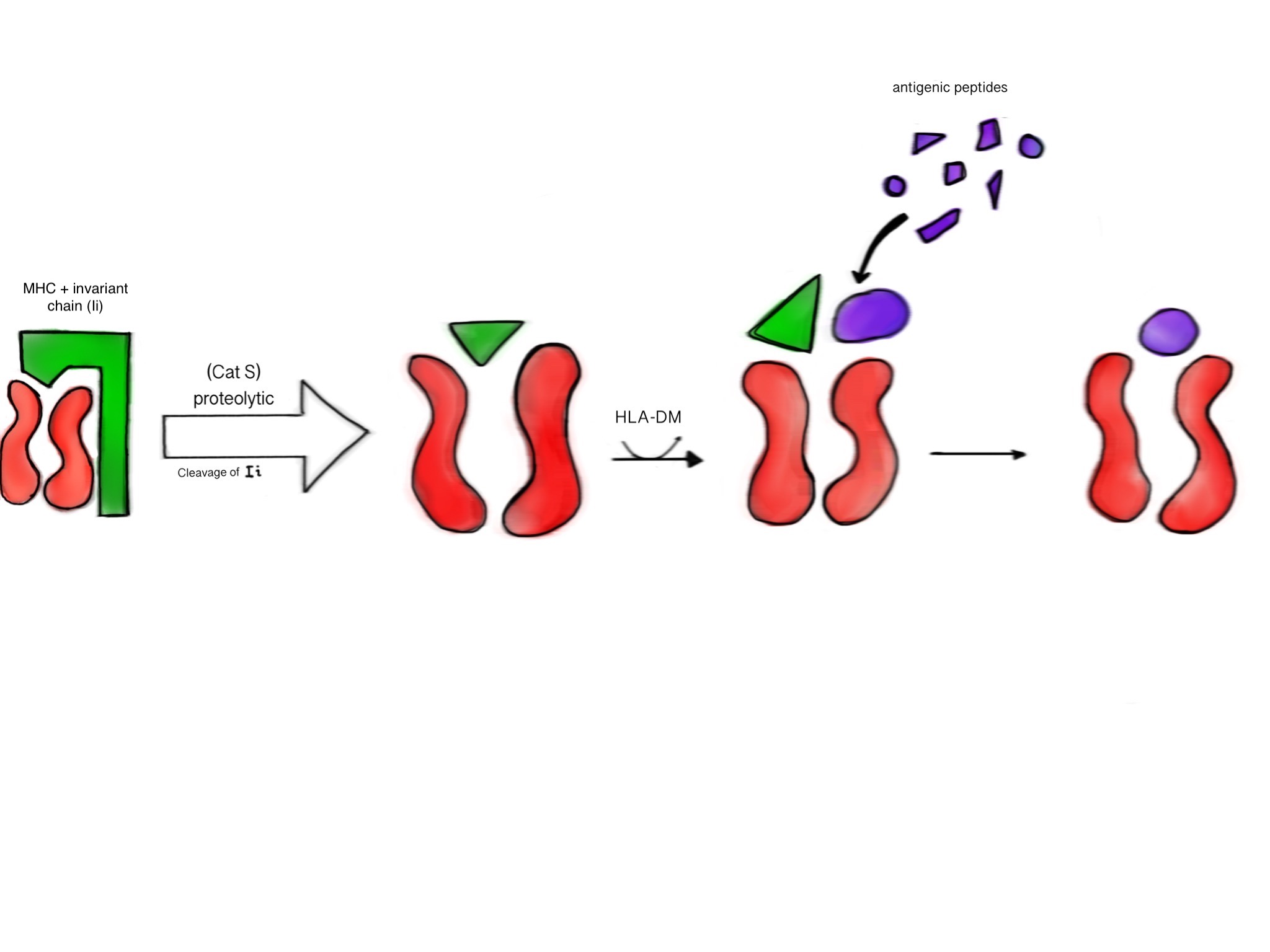
MHC II bound to invariant chain. Cathepsin S cleaves Ii, leaving CLIP bound. CLIP is readily exchanged for antigenic peptides, using HLA-DM as a chaperone protein.

CLIP or Class II-associated invariant chain peptide is the part of the invariant chain (Ii) that binds to the peptide binding groove of MHC class II and remains there until the MHC receptor is fully assembled. CLIP is one of the most prevalent self peptides found in the thymic cortex of most antigen-presenting cells. The purpose of CLIP is to prevent the degradation of MHC II dimers before antigenic peptides bind, and to prevent autoimmunity.

During MHC II assembly in the endoplasmic reticulum, the invariant chain polypeptide complexes with MHC II heterodimers. In a late endosome/early lysosome, cathepsin S cleaves the invariant chain, leaving CLIP bound to the MHC II complex. In the presence of antigenic peptide fragments, HLA-DM partially binds to the MHC II peptide binding groove and acts as a catalyst, releasing CLIP and allowing peptides to bind. Antigenic peptides have a high affinity for the MHC II groove, and are readily exchanged for CLIP. This occurs in most cells expressing MHC II–however, in B cells, HLA-DO functions as the accessory protein. Both HLA-DM and HLA-DO interact with each other to act as chaperone proteins and prevent the denaturing of MHC II. MHC II with bound antigen is then transported to the plasma membrane for presentation.

CLIP also can affect the differentiation of T cells. MHC II + CLIP complexes are upregulated on maturing dendritic cells, which activate and differentiate T cells into Thelper (T_{h)} and T_{cytotoxic} (T_{c)} cells. Th cells can polarize into Th1 or Th2 effector cells depending on the presence of cytokines. High expression of CLIP favors the release of IL-4 and Th2 cell polarization.

CLIP plays an important role in preventing autoimmunity. Since MHC is a polymorphic molecule, mutations that prevent CLIP from binding to MHC II leave the peptide binding groove empty. This could lead to the binding of other self-peptides and destruction of healthy cells. Autoimmune diseases such as rheumatoid arthritis, juvenile dermatomyositis, and Graves disease are all associated with low CLIP protein levels.
