= 60S ribosomal protein L13 =

Protein found in humans

RPL13

Identifiers
- Aliases: RPL13, BBC1, D16S444E, D16S44E, L13, ribosomal protein L13, SEMDIST
- External IDs: OMIM: 113703; MGI: 3642685; GeneCards: RPL13
Available structures
PDB	Human UniProt search: PDBe RCSB
PDB	List of PDB id codes 4UG0, 4V6X, 5AJ0, 4UJD, 4D67, 4D5Y, 4UJE, 4UJC

Gene location (Human)
Chr.	Chromosome 16 (human)
Band	16q24.3|17p11.2	Start	89,560,677 bp
Band	16q24.3|17p11.2	End	89,564,542 bp

Gene location (Mouse)
Chr.	Chromosome 3 (mouse)
Band	3 D|3 28.88 cM	Start	58,894,591 bp
Band	3 D|3 28.88 cM	End	58,895,226 bp
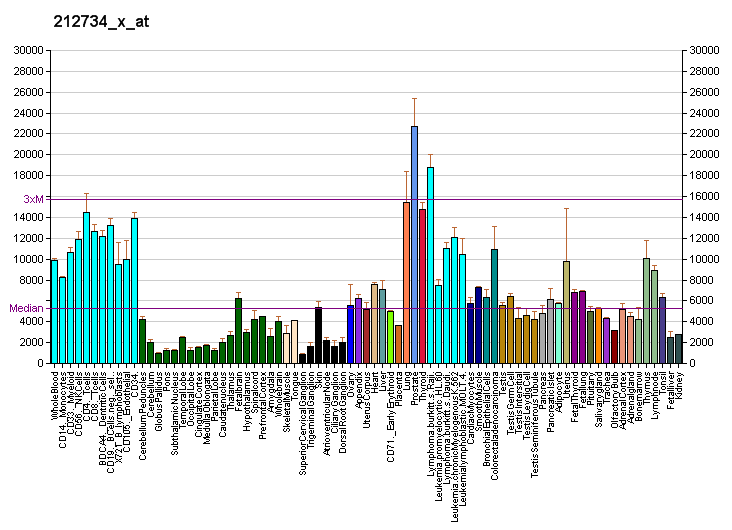

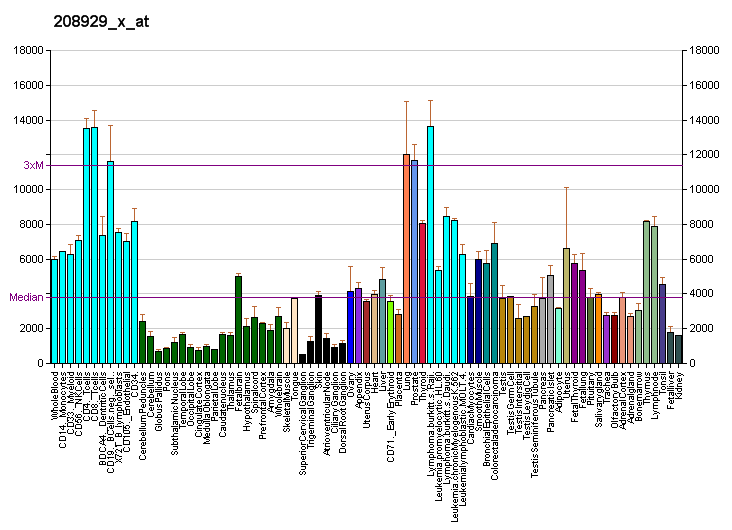

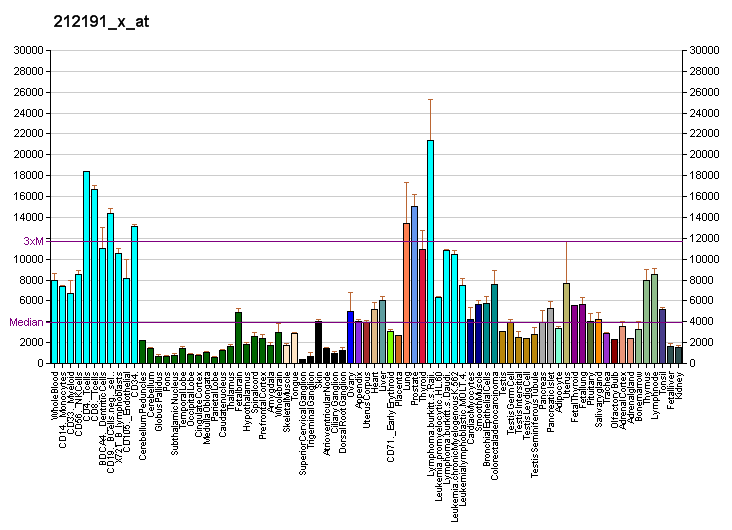
RNA expression pattern
Bgee	Human / Mouse (ortholog); Top expressed in: left ovary; right ovary; right uterine tube; skin of abdomen; skin of leg; canal of the cervix; ectocervix; anterior pituitary; body of uterus; olfactory zone of nasal mucosa / Top expressed in: dentate gyrus of hippocampal formation granule cell; embryo; embryo; morula; blastocyst; epiblast; lens; urinary bladder; duodenum; proximal tubule; More reference expression data
BioGPS	More reference expression data
Gene ontology
Molecular function	protein binding; structural constituent of ribosome; RNA binding
Cellular component	cytosol; ribosome; cytosolic ribosome; membrane; intracellular anatomical structure; cytosolic large ribosomal subunit; nucleus; nucleolus; endoplasmic reticulum
Biological process	viral transcription; SRP-dependent cotranslational protein targeting to membrane; translational initiation; nuclear-transcribed mRNA catabolic process, nonsense-mediated decay; rRNA processing; protein biosynthesis
Sources:Amigo / QuickGO
Orthologs
Databases	NCBI: entry; OMA: entry
Species	Human	Mouse
Entrez	6137	100040416
Ensembl	ENSG00000167526	ENSMUSG00000059776
UniProt	P26373	n/a
RefSeq (mRNA)	NM_033251; NM_000977; NM_001243130; NM_001243131	XM_036163486
RefSeq (protein)	NP_000968; NP_001230060; NP_150254	n/a
Location (UCSC)	Chr 16: 89.56 – 89.56 Mb	Chr 3: 58.89 – 58.9 Mb
PubMed search
- Wikidata
View/Edit Human	View/Edit Mouse

60S ribosomal protein L13 is a protein that in humans is encoded by the RPL13 gene.

== Function ==
Ribosomes, the organelles that catalyze protein synthesis, consist of a small 40S subunit and a large 60S subunit. Together these subunits are composed of 4 RNA species and approximately 80 structurally distinct proteins. This gene encodes a ribosomal protein that is a component of the 60S subunit. The protein belongs to the L13E family of ribosomal proteins. It is located in the cytoplasm. This gene is expressed at significantly higher levels in benign breast lesions than in breast carcinomas. Transcript variants derived from alternative splicing and/or alternative polyadenylation exist; these variants encode the same protein. As is typical for genes encoding ribosomal proteins, there are multiple processed pseudogenes of this gene dispersed through the genome.

== Interactions ==
RPL13 has been shown to interact with CDC5L.

== Bbc1 ==
Bbc1 (Mti1p) is a protein expressed in yeasts that is thought to associate with actin networks. Bbc1 is short for Bni1 synthetic lethal and Bee1 (las17) complex member. The alternate name, Mti1p, is short for Myosin tail region-interacting protein. Bbc1 is involved in cytoskeletal regulation during endocytosis. Budding yeast Bbc1 inhibits the activator of the Arp2/3 complex Las17 (WASp homolog). The protein also interacts with the tail of Myosin 1 proteins.

In fission yeast, Bbc1 is considered a WIP family cytoskeletal protein. Bbc1 localizes to actin cortical patches, cell division sites, the cell tip, and the cytosol. Cells with bbc1 gene deletion are viable. Bbc1 is affinity captured by the Nebulin-family actin filament anchoring protein Cyk3 and the SMARCAD1 family ATP-dependent DNA helicase Fft3. Bbc1 competes with WIP homolog Vrp1 to bind the Myosin 1 tail to regulate actin assembly at endocytic sites.
