= HLA-DRB1 =

Protein-coding gene in the species Homo sapiens

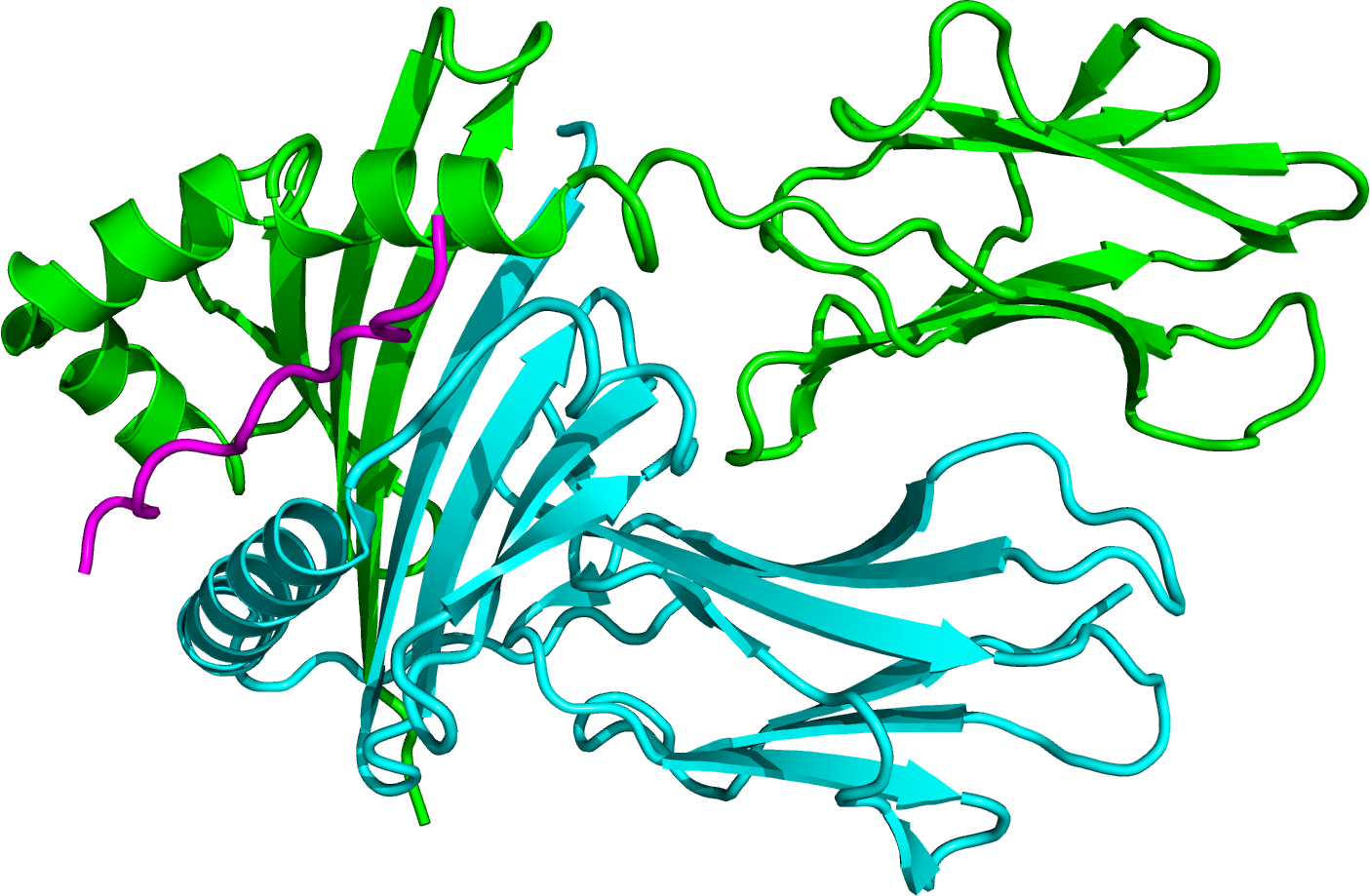

Identifiers
- Aliases: HLA-DRB1, DRB1, DRw10, HLA-DR1B, HLA-DRB, SS1, major histocompatibility complex, class II, DR beta 1
- External IDs: OMIM: 142857; MGI: 95901; GeneCards: HLA-DRB1
Available structures
PDB	Ortholog search: PDBe RCSB
PDB	List of PDB id codes 1A6A, 1BX2, 1YMM, 2WBJ,%%s1AQD, 1DLH, 1FYT, 1HXY, 1JWM, 1JWS, 1JWU, 1KG0, 1KLG, 1KLU, 1LO5, 1PYW, 1R5I, 1SEB, 1SJH, 1T5W, 1T5X, 2FSE, 2G9H, 2IAM, 2IAN, 2ICW, 2IPK, 2OJE, 2XN9, 3L6F, 3PDO, 3PGC, 3PGD, 3QXA, 3QXD, 3S4S, 3S5L, 4AEN, 4AH2, 4C56, 4E41, 4FQX, 4GBX, 4I5B, 4OV5, 4X5W, 4X5X,%%s1D5M, 1D5X, 1D5Z, 1D6E, 1J8H, 2SEB, 3O6F, 3T0E, 4IS6, 4MCY, 4MCZ, 4MD0, 4MD4, 4MD5, 4MDI, 4MDJ, 4Y19, 4Y1A

Gene location (Human)
Chr.	Chromosome 6 (human)
Band	6p21.32	Start	32,577,902 bp
Band	6p21.32	End	32,589,848 bp

Gene location (Mouse)
Chr.	Chromosome 17 (mouse)
Band	17 B1|17 17.98 cM	Start	34,524,841 bp
Band	17 B1|17 17.98 cM	End	34,535,648 bp
RNA expression pattern
Bgee	Human / Mouse (ortholog); Top expressed in: appendix; granulocyte; right lung; lymph node; spleen; upper lobe of left lung; monocyte; gallbladder; duodenum; right coronary artery / Top expressed in: mesenteric lymph nodes; spleen; thymus; submandibular gland; carotid body; right lung; lip; white adipose tissue; right lung lobe; tibiofemoral joint; More reference expression data
BioGPS	n/a
Gene ontology
Molecular function	peptide antigen binding; MHC class II receptor activity; protein binding; MHC class II protein complex binding
Cellular component	integral component of membrane; endocytic vesicle membrane; clathrin-coated endocytic vesicle membrane; endosome; Golgi apparatus; trans-Golgi network membrane; endoplasmic reticulum membrane; membrane; late endosome membrane; Golgi membrane; plasma membrane; transport vesicle membrane; MHC class II protein complex; lysosomal membrane; endoplasmic reticulum; ER to Golgi transport vesicle membrane; lysosome; integral component of lumenal side of endoplasmic reticulum membrane; endosome membrane; external side of plasma membrane; cell surface; extracellular exosome
Biological process	antigen processing and presentation; antigen processing and presentation of exogenous peptide antigen via MHC class II; immune system process; interferon-gamma-mediated signaling pathway; immunoglobulin production involved in immunoglobulin-mediated immune response; antigen processing and presentation of peptide or polysaccharide antigen via MHC class II; humoral immune response mediated by circulating immunoglobulin; immune response; peptide antigen assembly with MHC class II protein complex; T cell receptor signaling pathway; adaptive immune response; negative regulation of interferon-gamma production; inflammatory response to antigenic stimulus; protein tetramerization; regulation of interleukin-4 production; negative regulation of T cell proliferation; T-helper 1 type immune response; positive regulation of insulin secretion involved in cellular response to glucose stimulus; T cell costimulation
Sources:Amigo / QuickGO
Orthologs
Databases	NCBI: entry; OMA: entry
Species	Human	Mouse
Entrez	3123	14969
Ensembl	ENSG00000236884; ENSG00000206240; ENSG00000229074; ENSG00000196126; ENSG00000206306 ENSG00000228080	ENSMUSG00000060586
UniProt	P01911	P04231; P04230; P18468; P18469; O78196 n/a
RefSeq (mRNA)	NM_001243965; NM_002124; NM_001359193; NM_001359194	NM_010382
RefSeq (protein)	NP_001230894; NP_002115; NP_001346122; NP_001346123; NP_002115.2	NP_034512
Location (UCSC)	Chr 6: 32.58 – 32.59 Mb	Chr 17: 34.52 – 34.54 Mb
PubMed search
- Wikidata
View/Edit Human	View/Edit Mouse

HLA class II histocompatibility antigen, DRB1 beta chain is a protein that in humans is encoded by the HLA-DRB1 gene. DRB1 encodes the most prevalent beta subunit of HLA-DR. DRB1 alleles, especially those encoding amino acid sequence changes at positions 11 and 13, are associated risk of rheumatoid arthritis.

== Function ==
The protein encoded by this gene belongs to the HLA class II beta chain paralogues. The class II molecule is a heterodimer consisting of an alpha (DRA) and a beta chain (DRB), both anchored in the membrane. It plays a central role in the immune system by presenting peptides derived from extracellular proteins to T helper cells. Class II molecules are constitutively expressed in professional antigen-presenting cells (APC: B lymphocytes, dendritic cells, macrophages), and could be induced in non-professional APCs.

There is evidence it is associated with reduced severity of COVID-19 disease.

== Gene structure and polymorphisms ==
The beta chain is approximately 26-28 kDa. It is encoded by 6 exons, exon one encodes the leader peptide, exons 2 and 3 encode the two extracellular domains, exon 4 encodes the transmembrane domain and exon 5 encodes the cytoplasmic tail. Within the DR molecule the beta chain contains all the polymorphisms specifying the peptide binding specificities. To date, more than 3,700 HLA-DRB1 alleles have been described and made publicly available in the IPD-IMGT/HLA Database. HLA typing for these polymorphisms is routinely done for bone marrow and kidney transplantation.

== Gene expression ==
DRB1 is expressed at a level five times higher than its paralogues DRB3, DRB4 and DRB5. DRB1 is present in all individuals. Allelic variants of DRB1 are linked with either none or one of the genes DRB3, DRB4 and DRB5. There are 5 related pseudogenes: DRB2, DRB6, DRB7, DRB8 and DRB9.

Prevalence of the HLA-DRB1*10:01 allele was greatly increased in people with anti-IgLON5 disease.

== See also ==
- HLA-DR
