= HLA-DRB4 =

Protein-coding gene in the species Homo sapiens

Identifiers
- Aliases: HLA-DRB4, DR-4, DR4, DRB4, HLA-DR4B, major histocompatibility complex, class II, DR beta 4, HLA-DRB4*, HLA-DRB
- External IDs: GeneCards: HLA-DRB4

Gene location (Human)
| Chr. | Chromosome 6 (human) |
| Band | 6p21.3 | Start | 32,542,662 bp |
| Band | 6p21.3 | End | 32,557,610 bp |
Orthologs
| Databases | NCBI: entry |
| Species | Human | Mouse |
| Entrez | 3126 | n/a |
| Ensembl | n/a | n/a |
| UniProt | P13762 | n/a |
| RefSeq (mRNA) | NM_021983 | n/a |
| RefSeq (protein) | NP_068818 | n/a |
| Location (UCSC) | Chr 6: 32.54 – 32.56 Mb | n/a |
| PubMed search | | n/a |
- Wikidata
| View/Edit Human |

Major histocompatibility complex, class II, DR beta 4, also known as HLA-DRB4, is a human gene.

== Function ==
The protein encoded by this gene belongs to the HLA class II beta chain paralogues. The class II molecule is a heterodimer consisting of an alpha (DRA) and a beta chain (DRB), both anchored in the membrane. It plays a central role in the immune system by presenting peptides derived from extracellular proteins. Class II molecules are expressed in antigen-presenting cells (APC: B lymphocytes, dendritic cells, macrophages).

== Gene structure and polymorphisms ==
The beta chain is approximately 26-28 kDa. It is encoded by 6 exons, exon one encodes the leader peptide, exons 2 and 3 encode the two extracellular domains, exon 4 encodes the transmembrane domain and exon 5 encodes the cytoplasmic tail. Within the DR molecule the beta chain contains all the polymorphisms specifying the peptide binding specificities. Hundreds of DRB1 alleles have been described and typing for these polymorphisms is routinely done for bone marrow and kidney transplantation.

== Gene expression ==
DRB1 is expressed at a level five times higher than its paralogues DRB3, DRB4 and DRB5. DRB1 is present in all individuals. Allelic variants of DRB1 are linked with either none or one of the genes DRB3, DRB4 and DRB5. There are 4 related pseudogenes: DRB2, DRB6, DRB7, DRB8 and DRB9.

== See also ==
- HLA-DR
