= HLA-DM =

major histocompatibility complex, class II, DM alpha
- Histocompatibility_antigen_HLA-DM green: HLA class II histocompatibility antigen, DM alpha chain, Homo sapiens, Gene names: DMA, HLA-DMA, RING6 grey: HLA class II histocompatibility antigen, DM beta chain, Homo sapiens, Gene names: DMB, HLA-DMB, RING7

Identifiers
- Symbol: HLA-DMA
- NCBI gene: 3108
- HGNC: 4934
- OMIM: 142855
- RefSeq: NM_006120
- UniProt: P28067

Other data
- Locus: Chr. 6 p21.3
Search for
- Structures: Swiss-model
- Domains: InterPro

major histocompatibility complex, class II, DM beta
- Histocompatibility_antigen_HLA-DM grey: HLA class II histocompatibility antigen, DM alpha chain, Homo sapiens, Gene names: DMA, HLA-DMA, RING6 brown: HLA class II histocompatibility antigen, DM beta chain, Homo sapiens, Gene names: DMB, HLA-DMB, RING7

Identifiers
- Symbol: HLA-DMB
- NCBI gene: 3109
- HGNC: 4935
- OMIM: 142856
- RefSeq: NM_002118
- UniProt: P28068

Other data
- Locus: Chr. 6 p21.3
Search for
- Structures: Swiss-model
- Domains: InterPro

HLA-DM (human leukocyte antigen DM) is an intracellular protein involved in the mechanism of antigen presentation on antigen presenting cells (APCs) of the immune system. It does this by assisting in peptide loading of major histocompatibility complex (MHC) class II membrane-bound proteins. HLA-DM is encoded by the genes HLA-DMA and HLA-DMB.

HLA-DM is a molecular chaperone that works in lysosomes and endosomes in cells of the immune system. It works in APCs like macrophages, dendritic cells, and B cells by interacting with MHC class II molecules. HLA-DM protects the MHC class II molecules from breaking down, and regulates which proteins or peptides bind to them as well. This regulates how and when a peptide acts as an antigen initiating an immune response. Thus, HLA-DM is necessary for the immune system to respond effectively to a foreign invader. Impairment in HLA-DM function can result in immunodeficiency and autoimmune diseases.

== Genetics ==
The genes for HLA-DM are located in the MHCII region of the human chromosome 6. The genes code for the alpha and beta chains that make up the protein.

The gene is nonpolymorphic.

== Function ==
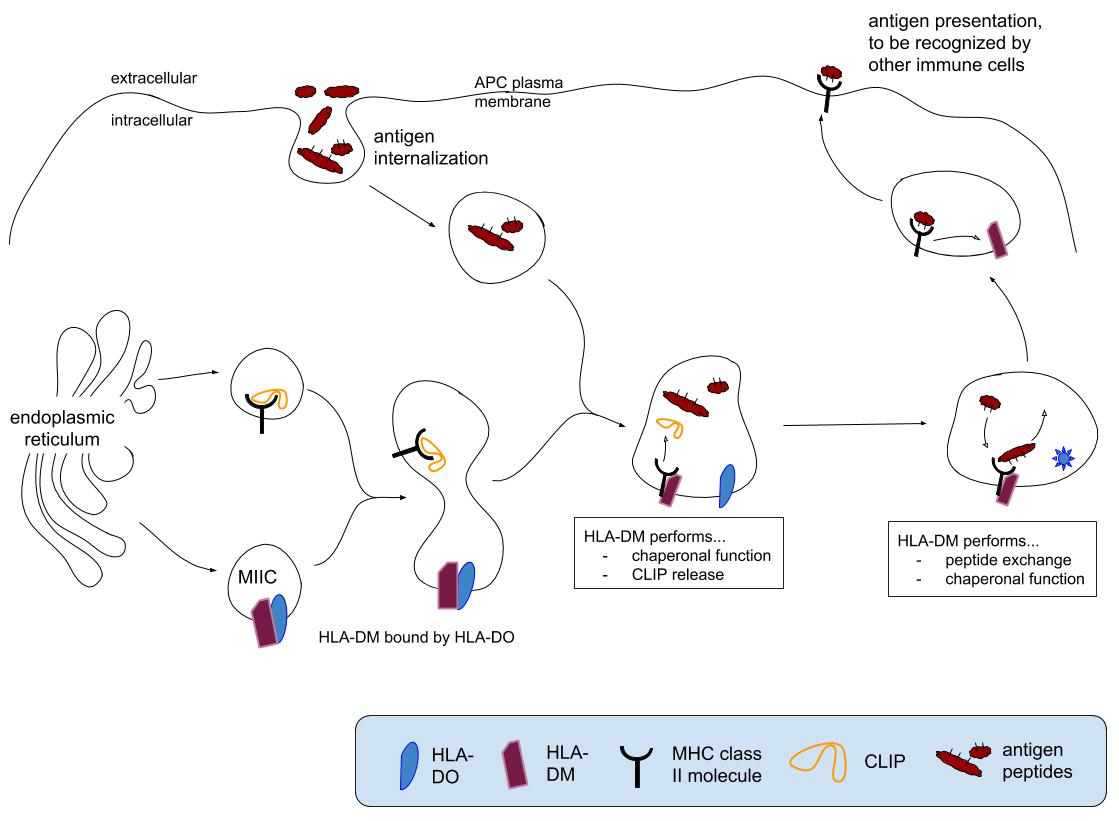
HLA-DM transport and functions from the ER to the cell surface of an APC. HLA-DM is synthesized in the endoplasmic reticulum (ER) of antigen presenting cells (APCs), and transported in endosomes while binding to HLA-DO. The HLA-DM containing endosome fuses with an MHC class II containing endosome, which then subsequently fuses with an antigen-containgin endosome. Once in the presence of antigen, HLA-DM associates with MHC class II and releases CLIP from the peptide binding groove. HLA-DO degrades, and HLA-DM facilitates peptide exchange to ensure high affinity binding between the MHC class II and its peptide. The late endosome then fuses with the plasma membrane to present MHC class II + peptide on its surface. This can be recognized by other immune cells and initiate a response.

=== MHC class II + peptide interactions ===
HLA-DM is an integral protein in the mechanism regulating which antigens are presented extracellularly on APCs. It binds partially to the peptide-binding groove of MHC class II molecules. This can affect how well your immune system responds to foreign invaders.

HLA-DM is required to release CLIP from MHC class II molecules, to chaperone empty MHC molecules against denaturation, and to control proper loading and release of peptides at the peptide-binding groove. It also interacts heavily with chaperone protein HLA-DO. All of this ensures proper antigen presentation by an APC, to activate other immune cells. This is critical to rid the body of harmful infections. For example, proper antigen presentation benefits T cell activation, and memory T cell survival and generation. Without it, T cells leaving their site of production and entering the circulatory vessels of the body will not be activated against a danger. The immune system will not be able to kill dangerous or infected cells, and will not react quickly against a second infection.

==== MHC class II molecule stabilization - chaperonal function ====
The low pH of lysosomes could cause denaturation or proteolysis of MHC class II molecules. HLA-DM binding to MHC stabilizes and protects from degradation, by covering hydrophobic surfaces. Antigen degradation could also ensue, resulting in an inability to bind to the peptide-binding groove. Thus, HLA-DM is needed to protect proteins against the lysosomal environment.

==== CLIP release ====
In order to ensure that no false peptides bind to an MHC class II molecule, the peptide-binding groove is occupied by a protein called CLIP. Once a proper peptide is encountered, HLA-DM catalyzes the exchange of CLIP for an antigen peptide. Often, this peptide is retrieved directly from the B cell receptor which internalized it. Through expulsion of CLIP at the proper time, HLA-DM ensures that the correct antigen can bind to MHC molecules and prevent either from degrading.

==== Antigen loading and release ====
Apart from CLIP-antigen exchange, HLA-DM also facilitates antigen-antigen exchange. It releases weakly bound peptides from the groove to load peptides with higher-affinity binding. This process occurs in endosomes once they have left the ER containing MHC and HLA-DM that have fused with antigen-containing lysosomes. Kinetic analysis studies have shown that HLA-DM loading occurs quickly and in many endosomes. Along the membrane of an endosome at the optimal acidity (pH=5.0), HLA-DM loads 3 to 12 peptides onto different MHC molecules per minute.

HLA-DM assists in catalysis of peptide exchange not only in late endosomes traveling from the ER, but also on cell membranes and in early endosomes. Much of this pathway is still being researched, but it is known that HLA-DM can load exogenous peptides onto MHC class II molecules when they are being expressed on cell surfaces. Loading can also occur in early endosomes that are quickly recycled. In both of these areas, loading occurs slower due to an altered pH environment.

Release

To release peptides from the MHC groove, HLA-DM binds to the N terminus of the groove, altering its conformation and breaking hydrogen bonds such that the peptide that was interacting with the MHC groove can no longer bind and is ejected.

Loading

Quick loading of peptides, facilitated by a stable MHC-DM complex, decreases the chances of those peptides being broken down by the proteolytic environment in the endosome. HLA-DM dissociates from the MHC once a stable enough peptide has bound. Thus, only antigens that can "outcompete" others by binding strongly enough to the groove end up on the surface of the antigen presenting cells in MHC class II molecules.

==== Interaction with HLA-DO ====
HLA-DM also binds to HLA-DO, another non-classical MHC molecule. HLA-DO starts binding to DM in early endosomes, but is expressed less in late endosomes/lysosomes. The binding between HLA-DM and HLA-DO is less strong at low pH, but overall much stronger than HLA-DM binding to MHC molecules.

Before encountering an antigen, DO acts as a chaperone of DM to stabilize it against denaturation and direct it into lysosomes. It binds in the same location to HLA-DM as MHC class II molecules bind, thereby preventing HLA-DM from binding to MHC class II molecules. This inhibits peptide exchange catalysis and keeps CLIP in the MHC groove until antigen-containing lysosome fuses with DM/DO/MHC containing lysosomes, prompting the degradation of HLA-DO molecules in MIICs.

== Structure and binding ==
HLA-DM contains a N-terminal class II histocompatibility antigen, alpha domain and a C-terminal Immunoglobulin C1-set domain.

Research in crystallography has resulted in advanced knowledge on HLA-DM structure, and how it binds to its substrates (HLA-DO and MHC class II molecules).

=== HLA-DM structure ===
The structure and sequence of HLA-DM proteins is very similar to other MHC class II molecules, all of which consist of a heterodimer composed of an alpha and beta chain. However, HLA-DM differs in that it is nonclassical (meaning it lacks a transport signal N-terminus), and does not have the capability to bind peptides. This is due to lack of a deep peptide binding groove – instead, it contains a shallow, negatively charged indent with two disulfide bonds.

On its beta chain cytoplasmic tail, a tyrosine-based motif YTPL regulates trafficking to specific endosomal compartments called MHC class II compartments (MIICs) from the ER.

=== Binding with MHC class II ===
HLA-DM catalyzes peptide exchange through binding at the beta chain of MHC class II molecules, which alters the conformation of the MHC and its peptide-binding groove. HLA-DM conformation stays constant. When a peptide is bound to the P1 locus in the peptide binding groove, it is stably bound. This also hinders HLA-DM binding to the MHC, preventing destabilization of the peptide-MHC interaction. Peptides also bind to the C-terminal site of the binding groove, but in this case the binding is a weak association, leaving the N-terminal of the groove open. HLA-DM can then bind to the N-terminal and allowing for peptide exchange.

=== Binding with HLA-DO ===
HLA-DO binds to the same regions of HLA-DM as MHC class II molecules do, such that it blocks the ability of HLA-DM to bind with MHC. Thus, you can never have a complex containing HLA-DM, HLA-DO, and MHC class II molecules.

== Expression and location ==
Intracellularly, HLA-DM is translated in the endoplasmic reticulum, then transported to endosomal MHC class II compartments (MIICs). MIICs then join with endosomes containing MHC class II molecules bound to CLIP. Here, the HLA-DM begins editing the MHC peptide binding.

HLA-DM is also expressed on the surface of B cells and dendritic cells, as well as in secreted exosomes.

During B cell development, HLA-DM is first expressed in early stages in the bone marrow. Expression then remains high throughout development and a B cell's life, until the B cell differentiates into a plasma cell and HLA-DM expression then decreases.

Within the body, highest levels of HLA-DM expression is found in lymph nodes, the spleen, and bone marrow.

== Role in disease and medicine ==
=== Immunodeficiency ===
In individuals lacking functional HLA-DM molecules, improper antigen presentation occurs, resulting in unwanted immune responses or lack of a response when danger is present. This has been shown experimentally through mouse knockout models. There will be an increase of CLIP, instead of peptide, presentation on APC surfaces. This can result in autoimmunity, if a T cell receptors recognize CLIP as a harmful antigen. There could also be no protein presentation at all, resulting in a lack of immune response.

=== Infections and disease ===
Type 1 diabetes is correlated with DM activation, which is hypothesized to be due to DM positively modulating the expression of disease-causing peptides in the MHC groove and thus presented to responding T cells. Experiments using the mouse model of type 1 diabetes which blocked DM or reduced its activity by overexpressing DO found a decrease in diabetes.

HLA-DM is implicated in viral infections like Herpes Simplex Virus Type 1. This virus causes uneven distribution of HLA-DM in endosomes, prevents peptide catalysis, and prevents presentation of MHC class II molecules on the cell surface.

HLA-DM is also implicated in celiac disease, multiple sclerosis, other autoimmune diseases, and leukemia.
