= HLA-DRB3 =

Protein-coding gene in the species Homo sapiens

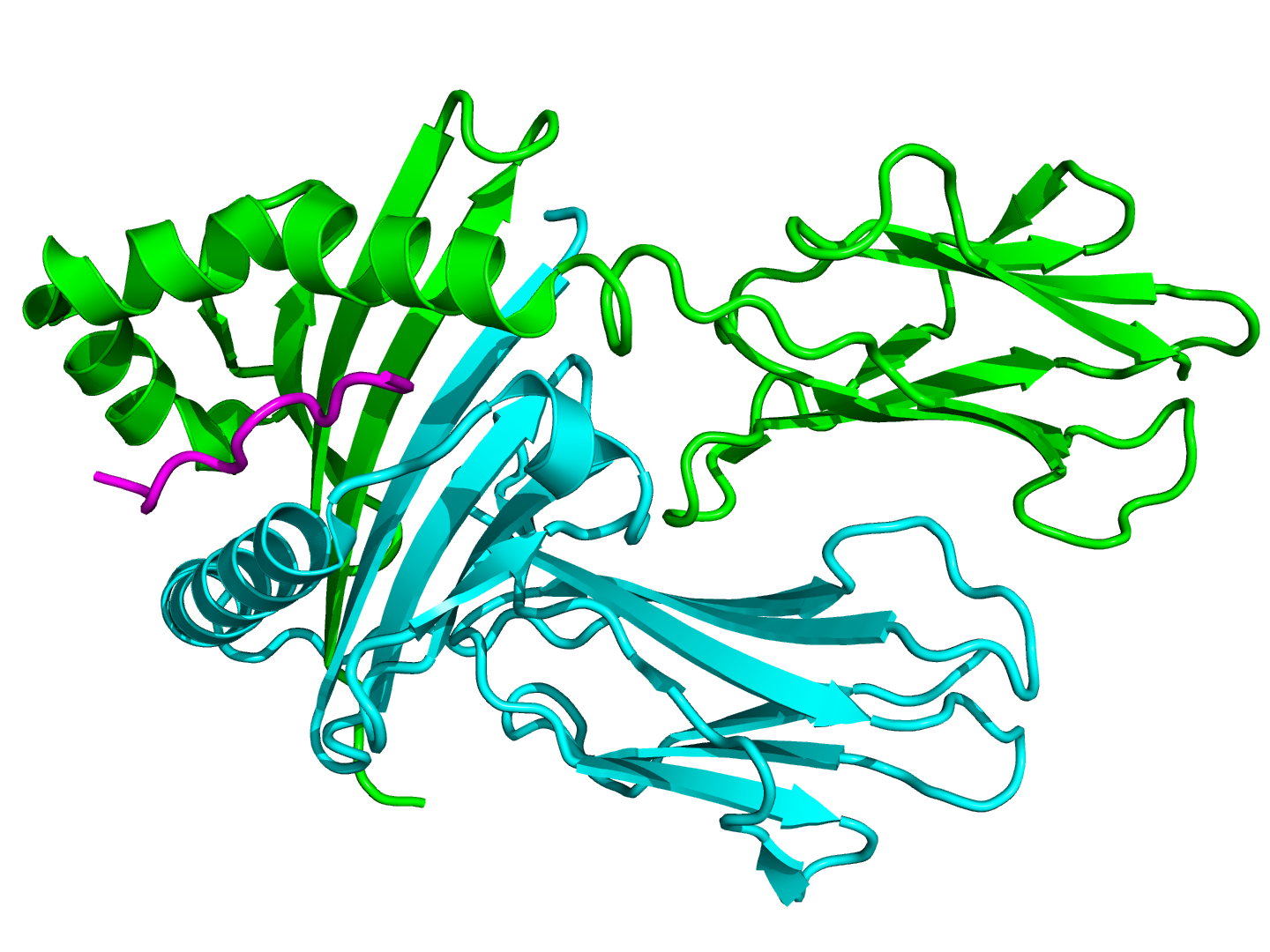

Identifiers
- Aliases: HLA-DRB3, HLA-DR3B, DRB1, DRw10, HLA-DR1B, HLA-DRB, SS1, major histocompatibility complex, class II, DR beta 3, HLA-DPB1, DRB3, HLA-DRB3*
- External IDs: OMIM: 612735; GeneCards: HLA-DRB3
Available structures
PDB	Human UniProt search: PDBe RCSB
PDB	List of PDB id codes 2Q6W, 4H1L
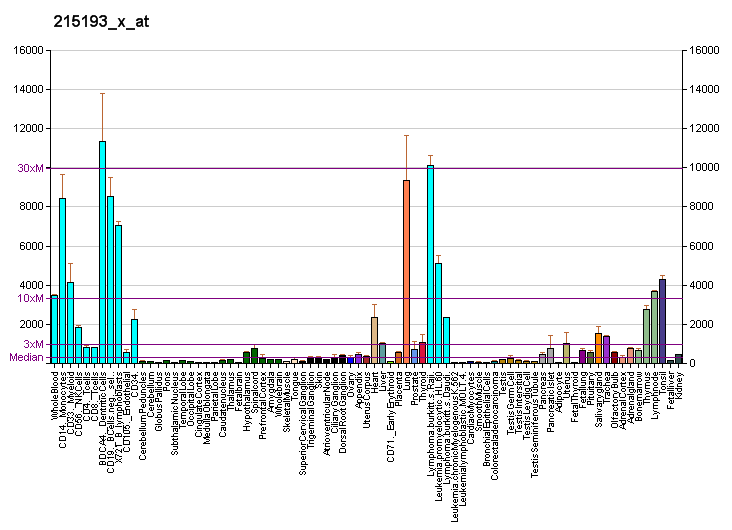

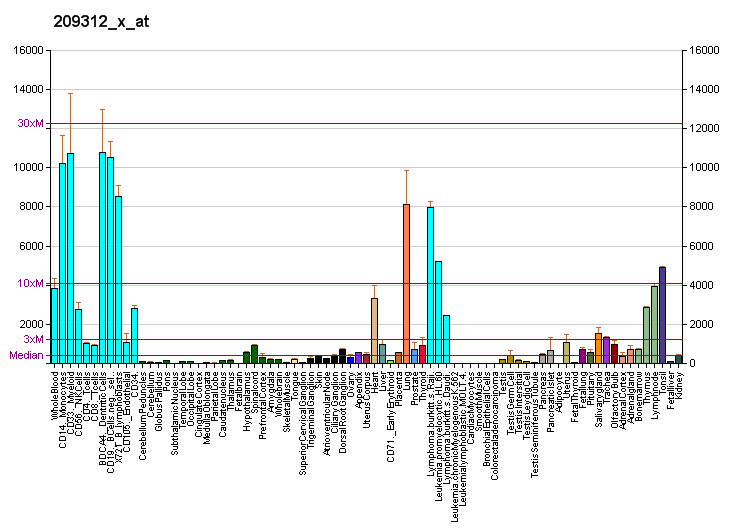
RNA expression pattern
Bgee	Human / Mouse (ortholog); n/a / n/a
BioGPS	More reference expression data
Gene ontology
Molecular function	peptide antigen binding; MHC class II receptor activity
Cellular component	integral component of membrane; endocytic vesicle membrane; clathrin-coated endocytic vesicle membrane; endosome; Golgi apparatus; trans-Golgi network membrane; endoplasmic reticulum membrane; membrane; late endosome membrane; Golgi membrane; plasma membrane; transport vesicle membrane; integral component of plasma membrane; MHC class II protein complex; lysosomal membrane; endoplasmic reticulum; ER to Golgi transport vesicle membrane; lysosome; integral component of lumenal side of endoplasmic reticulum membrane; endosome membrane
Biological process	antigen processing and presentation; antigen processing and presentation of exogenous peptide antigen via MHC class II; interferon-gamma-mediated signaling pathway; immune system process; T cell costimulation; antigen processing and presentation of peptide or polysaccharide antigen via MHC class II; immune response; T cell receptor signaling pathway; signal transduction; adaptive immune response
Sources:Amigo / QuickGO
Orthologs
Databases	NCBI: entry
Species	Human	Mouse
Entrez	3125	n/a
Ensembl	n/a	n/a
UniProt	P79483	n/a
RefSeq (mRNA)	NM_022555	n/a
RefSeq (protein)	NP_072049	n/a
Location (UCSC)	n/a	n/a
PubMed search		n/a
- Wikidata
View/Edit Human

HLA class II histocompatibility antigen, DRB3-1 beta chain is a protein that in humans is encoded by the HLA-DRB3 gene.

== Function ==
The protein encoded by this gene belongs to the HLA class II beta chain paralogues. The class II molecule is a heterodimer consisting of an alpha (DRA) and a beta chain (DRB), both anchored in the membrane. It plays a central role in the immune system by presenting peptides derived from extracellular proteins. Class II molecules are expressed in antigen-presenting cells (APC: B lymphocytes, dendritic cells, macrophages).

== Gene structure and polymorphisms ==
The beta chain is approximately 26–28 kDa. It is encoded by 6 exons, exon one encodes the leader peptide, exons 2 and 3 encode the two extracellular domains, exon 4 encodes the transmembrane domain and exon 5 encodes the cytoplasmic tail. Within the DR molecule the beta chain contains all the polymorphisms specifying the peptide binding specificities. Typing for these polymorphisms is routinely done for bone marrow and kidney transplantation.

== Gene expression ==
DRB1 is expressed at a level five times higher than its paralogues DRB3, DRB4 and DRB5. DRB1 is present in all individuals. Allelic variants of DRB1 are linked with either none or one of the genes DRB3, DRB4 and DRB5. There are 4 related pseudogenes: DRB2, DRB6, DRB7, DRB8 and DRB9.

== See also ==
- HLA-DR
