= HLA-DMA =

Protein-coding gene in the species Homo sapiens

Identifiers
- Aliases: HLA-DMA, D6S222E, DMA, HLADM, RING6, major histocompatibility complex, class II, DM alpha
- External IDs: OMIM: 142855; MGI: 95921; GeneCards: HLA-DMA
Available structures
PDB	Ortholog search: PDBe RCSB
PDB	List of PDB id codes 1HDM, 2BC4, 4FQX, 4GBX

Gene location (Human)
Chr.	Chromosome 6 (human)
Band	6p21.32	Start	32,948,613 bp
Band	6p21.32	End	32,969,094 bp

Gene location (Mouse)
Chr.	Chromosome 17 (mouse)
Band	17 B1|17 17.98 cM	Start	34,338,515 bp
Band	17 B1|17 17.98 cM	End	34,358,075 bp
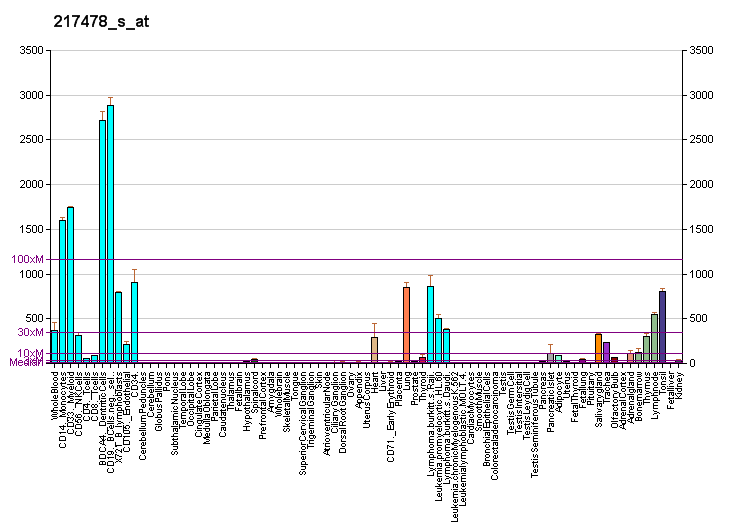
RNA expression pattern
Bgee	Human / Mouse (ortholog); Top expressed in: granulocyte; monocyte; lymph node; spleen; appendix; gallbladder; upper lobe of left lung; right lung; duodenum; rectum / Top expressed in: spleen; mesenteric lymph nodes; thymus; blood; lactiferous gland; subcutaneous adipose tissue; jejunum; Paneth cell; sciatic nerve; ankle joint; More reference expression data
BioGPS	More reference expression data
Gene ontology
Molecular function	MHC class II protein complex binding; protein binding
Cellular component	integral component of membrane; cell surface; endosome; lysosome; extracellular exosome; late endosome membrane; membrane; lysosomal membrane; MHC class II protein complex; intracellular membrane-bounded organelle
Biological process	antigen processing and presentation of peptide or polysaccharide antigen via MHC class II; peptide antigen assembly with MHC class II protein complex; antigen processing and presentation; antigen processing and presentation of exogenous peptide antigen via MHC class II; immune response; immune system process; adaptive immune response
Sources:Amigo / QuickGO
Orthologs
Databases	NCBI: entry; OMA: entry
Species	Human	Mouse
Entrez	3108	14998
Ensembl	ENSG00000243215; ENSG00000243719; ENSG00000239463; ENSG00000204257; ENSG00000242361 ENSG00000241394; ENSG00000243189; ENSG00000242685	ENSMUSG00000037649
UniProt	P28067	P28078; Q31621
RefSeq (mRNA)	NM_006120	NM_010386; NM_001360530
RefSeq (protein)	n/a	NP_034516; NP_001347459
Location (UCSC)	Chr 6: 32.95 – 32.97 Mb	Chr 17: 34.34 – 34.36 Mb
PubMed search
- Wikidata
View/Edit Human	View/Edit Mouse

HLA class II histocompatibility antigen, DM alpha chain is a protein that in humans is encoded by the HLA-DMA gene.

HLA-DMA belongs to the HLA class II alpha chain paralogues. HLA-DM is a heterodimer consisting of an alpha (HLA-DMA) and a beta (HLA-DMB) chain, both anchored in the membrane. It is located in intracellular vesicles. This class II molecule plays a central role in the peptide loading of MHC class II molecules by helping to release the CLIP (class II-associated invariant chain peptide) molecule from the peptide binding site. Class II molecules are expressed in antigen presenting cells (APC: B lymphocytes, dendritic cells, macrophages). The alpha chain is approximately 33-35 kDa and its gene contains 5 exons. Exon one encodes the leader peptide, exons 2 and 3 encode the two extracellular domains, exon 4 encodes the transmembrane domain and the cytoplasmic tail.
