= HLA-DRB5 =

Protein-coding gene in the species Homo sapiens

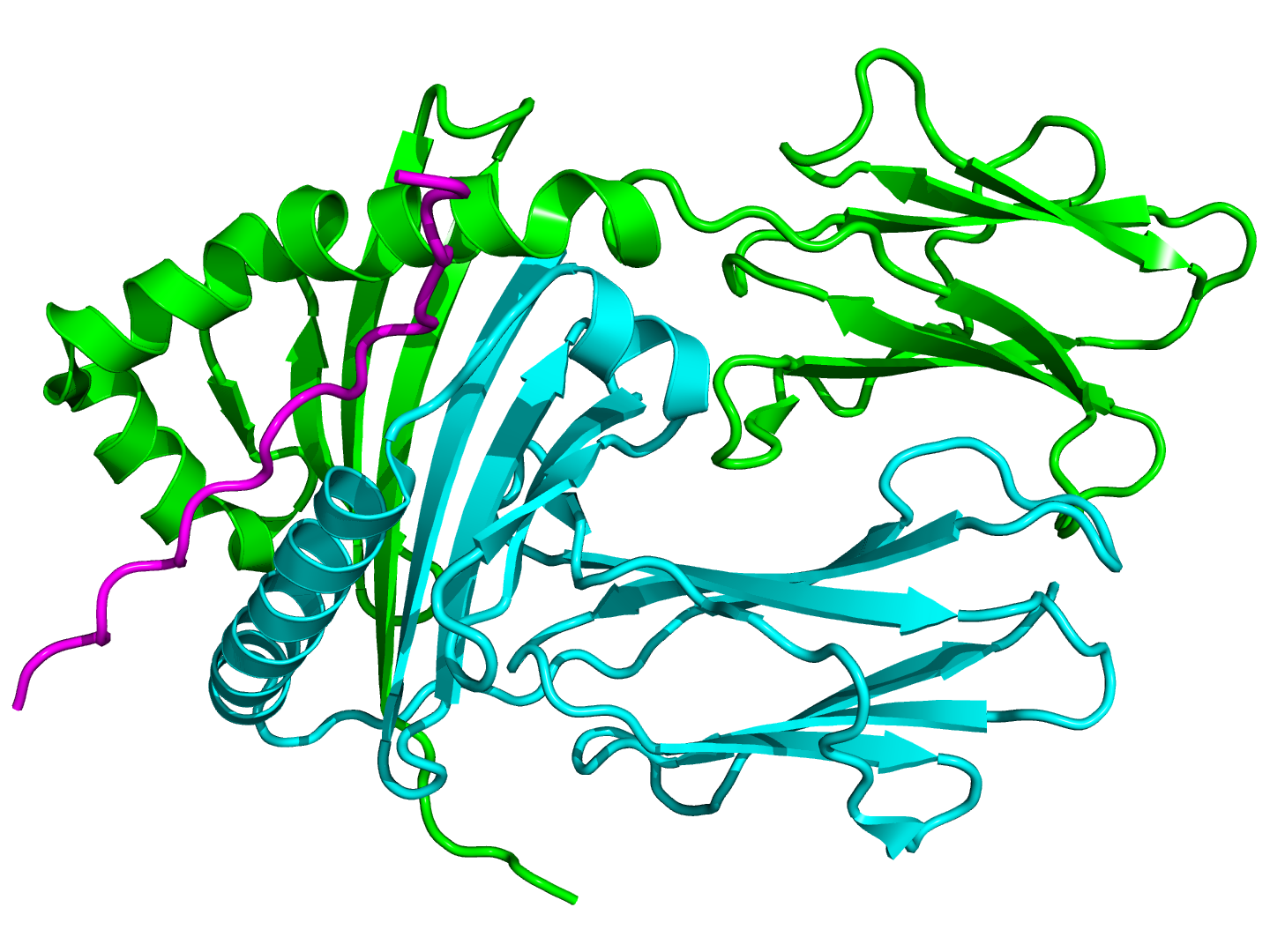

Identifiers
- Aliases: HLA-DRB5, HLA-DRB, major histocompatibility complex, class II, DR beta 5, HLA-DRB5*
- External IDs: OMIM: 604776; MGI: 95901; GeneCards: HLA-DRB5
Available structures
PDB	Ortholog search: PDBe RCSB
PDB	List of PDB id codes 1FV1, 1H15, 1HQR, 1ZGL

Gene location (Human)
Chr.	Chromosome 6 (human)
Band	6p21.32	Start	32,517,353 bp
Band	6p21.32	End	32,530,287 bp

Gene location (Mouse)
Chr.	Chromosome 17 (mouse)
Band	17 B1|17 17.98 cM	Start	34,524,841 bp
Band	17 B1|17 17.98 cM	End	34,535,648 bp
RNA expression pattern
Bgee	Human / Mouse (ortholog); Top expressed in: granulocyte; lymph node; appendix; duodenum; monocyte; upper lobe of left lung; right coronary artery; spleen; right lung; olfactory zone of nasal mucosa / Top expressed in: mesenteric lymph nodes; spleen; thymus; submandibular gland; carotid body; right lung; lip; white adipose tissue; right lung lobe; tibiofemoral joint; More reference expression data
BioGPS	n/a
Gene ontology
Molecular function	peptide antigen binding
Cellular component	integral component of membrane; endocytic vesicle membrane; clathrin-coated endocytic vesicle membrane; endosome; Golgi apparatus; trans-Golgi network membrane; endoplasmic reticulum membrane; membrane; late endosome membrane; Golgi membrane; plasma membrane; transport vesicle membrane; MHC class II protein complex; lysosomal membrane; endoplasmic reticulum; ER to Golgi transport vesicle membrane; lysosome; integral component of lumenal side of endoplasmic reticulum membrane; endosome membrane; extracellular exosome
Biological process	antigen processing and presentation; antigen processing and presentation of exogenous peptide antigen via MHC class II; interferon-gamma-mediated signaling pathway; immune system process; T cell costimulation; antigen processing and presentation of peptide or polysaccharide antigen via MHC class II; immune response; T cell receptor signaling pathway; adaptive immune response
Sources:Amigo / QuickGO
Orthologs
Databases	NCBI: entry; OMA: entry
Species	Human	Mouse
Entrez	3127	14969
Ensembl	ENSG00000198502	ENSMUSG00000060586
UniProt	Q30154	P04231; P04230; P18468; P18469; O78196 n/a
RefSeq (mRNA)	NM_002125	NM_010382
RefSeq (protein)	NP_002116	NP_034512
Location (UCSC)	Chr 6: 32.52 – 32.53 Mb	Chr 17: 34.52 – 34.54 Mb
PubMed search
- Wikidata
View/Edit Human	View/Edit Mouse

HLA class II histocompatibility antigen, DRB5 beta chain is a protein that in humans is encoded by the HLA-DRB5 gene.

== Function ==
The protein encoded by this gene belongs to the HLA class II beta chain paralogues. The class II molecule is a heterodimer consisting of an alpha (DRA) and a beta chain (DRB), both anchored in the membrane. It plays a central role in the immune system by presenting peptides derived from extracellular proteins. Class II molecules are expressed in antigen-presenting cells (APC: B lymphocytes, dendritic cells, macrophages).

== Gene structure and polymorphisms ==
The beta chain is approximately 26-28 kDa. It is encoded by 6 exons, exon one encodes the leader peptide, exons 2 and 3 encode the two extracellular domains, exon 4 encodes the transmembrane domain and exon 5 encodes the cytoplasmic tail. Within the DR molecule the beta chain contains all the polymorphisms specifying the peptide binding specificities. Hundreds of DRB1 alleles have been described and typing for these polymorphisms is routinely done for bone marrow and kidney transplantation.

== Gene expression ==
DRB1 is expressed at a level five times higher than its paralogues DRB3, DRB4 and DRB5. DRB1 is present in all individuals. Allelic variants of DRB1 are linked with either none or one of the genes DRB3, DRB4 and DRB5. The presence of DRB5 is linked with allelic variants of DRB1, otherwise it is omitted. There are 4 related pseudogenes: DRB2, DRB6, DRB7, DRB8 and DRB9.

== See also ==
- HLA-DR
