= HLA-DMB =

Protein-coding gene in the species Homo sapiens

Identifiers
- Aliases: HLA-DMB, D6S221E, RING7, major histocompatibility complex, class II, DM beta
- External IDs: OMIM: 142856; MGI: 95922; GeneCards: HLA-DMB
Available structures
PDB	Ortholog search: PDBe RCSB
PDB	List of PDB id codes 1HDM, 2BC4, 4FQX, 4GBX, 4I0P

Gene location (Human)
Chr.	Chromosome 6 (human)
Band	6p21.32	Start	32,934,629 bp
Band	6p21.32	End	32,941,028 bp

Gene location (Mouse)
Chr.	Chromosome 17 (mouse)
Band	17 B1|17 17.98 cM	Start	34,372,046 bp
Band	17 B1|17 17.98 cM	End	34,379,204 bp
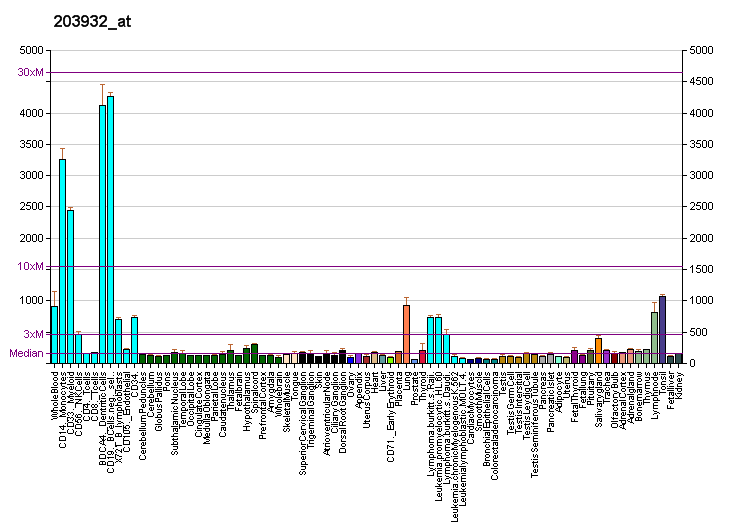
RNA expression pattern
Bgee	Human / Mouse (ortholog); Top expressed in: monocyte; granulocyte; lymph node; appendix; spleen; duodenum; gallbladder; right lung; upper lobe of left lung; rectum / Top expressed in: mesenteric lymph nodes; spleen; blood; right kidney; ankle joint; superior surface of tongue; thymus; sciatic nerve; lip; subcutaneous adipose tissue; More reference expression data
BioGPS	More reference expression data
Gene ontology
Molecular function	MHC class II protein complex binding; protein binding
Cellular component	lysosomal membrane; lysosome; membrane; endosome; late endosome membrane; integral component of membrane; MHC class II protein complex
Biological process	positive regulation of T cell activation via T cell receptor contact with antigen bound to MHC molecule on antigen presenting cell; antigen processing and presentation; MHC class II protein complex assembly; positive regulation of T cell proliferation; antigen processing and presentation of peptide or polysaccharide antigen via MHC class II; peptide antigen assembly with MHC class II protein complex; immune system process; antigen processing and presentation of exogenous peptide antigen via MHC class II; immune response; adaptive immune response
Sources:Amigo / QuickGO
Orthologs
Databases	NCBI: entry; OMA: entry
Species	Human	Mouse
Entrez	3109	14999
Ensembl	ENSG00000241674; ENSG00000226264; ENSG00000242574; ENSG00000239329; ENSG00000234154 ENSG00000242386; ENSG00000242092; ENSG00000241296	ENSMUSG00000079547
UniProt	P28068	P35737; Q31094
RefSeq (mRNA)	NM_002118	NM_010387
RefSeq (protein)	NP_002109	NP_034517
Location (UCSC)	Chr 6: 32.93 – 32.94 Mb	Chr 17: 34.37 – 34.38 Mb
PubMed search
- Wikidata
View/Edit Human	View/Edit Mouse

HLA class II histocompatibility antigen, DM beta chain is a protein that in humans is encoded by the HLA-DMB gene.

== Function ==
HLA-DMB belongs to the HLA class II beta chain paralogues. HLA-DM is a heterodimer consisting of an alpha (HLA-DMA) and a beta (HLA-DMB) chain, both anchored in the membrane. It is located in intracellular vesicles. This class II molecule plays a central role in the peptide loading of MHC class II molecules by helping to release the CLIP (class II-associated invariant chain peptide) molecule from the peptide binding site. Class II molecules are expressed in antigen presenting cells (APC: B lymphocytes, dendritic cells, macrophages). The beta chain is approximately 26–28 kDa and its gene contains 6 exons. Exon one encodes the leader peptide, exons 2 and 3 encode the two extracellular domains, exon 4 encodes the transmembrane domain and exon 5 encodes the cytoplasmic tail.

== Clinical significance ==
HLA-DMB is upregulated in tumor tissue of Caucasian but not African patients. Its role in tumor immunology is undefined but has been shown to positively correlated with increased T-cell infiltration and improved prognosis in ovarian cancer. Differential immune processes mediated by HLA-DMB may contribute to the disparity in cancer outcome.
