= HLA-DOA =

Protein-coding gene in the species Homo sapiens

Identifiers
- Aliases: HLA-DOA, HLA-DNA, HLA-DZA, HLADZ, major histocompatibility complex, class II, DO alpha
- External IDs: OMIM: 142930; MGI: 95924; GeneCards: HLA-DOA
Available structures
PDB	Human UniProt search: PDBe RCSB
PDB	List of PDB id codes 4I0P

Gene location (Human)
Chr.	Chromosome 6 (human)
Band	6p21.32	Start	33,004,182 bp
Band	6p21.32	End	33,009,591 bp

Gene location (Mouse)
Chr.	Chromosome 17 (mouse)
Band	17 B1|17 17.98 cM	Start	34,311,314 bp
Band	17 B1|17 17.98 cM	End	34,314,208 bp
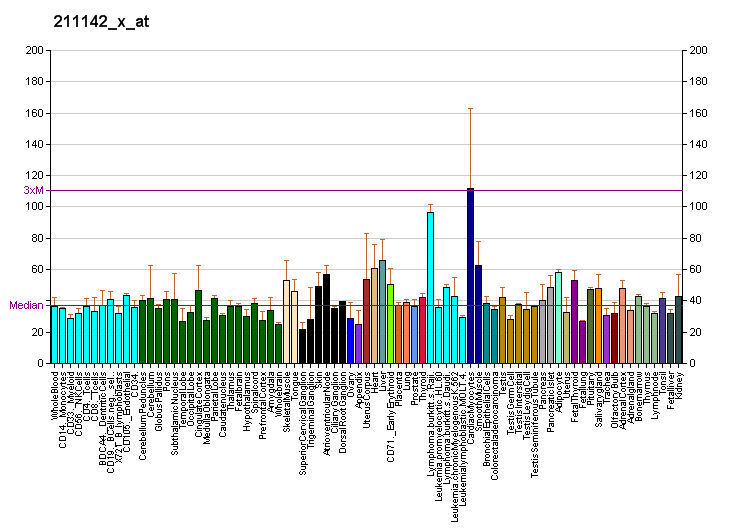

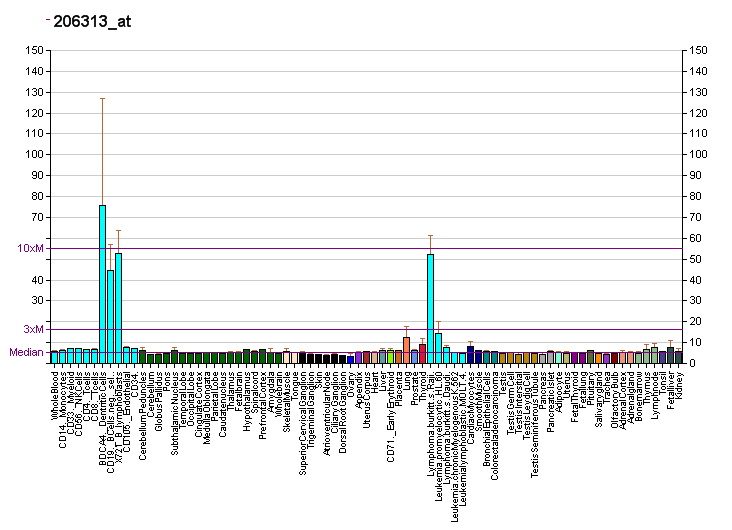
RNA expression pattern
Bgee	Human / Mouse (ortholog); Top expressed in: lymph node; appendix; granulocyte; spleen; gallbladder; monocyte; blood; tonsil; upper lobe of left lung; right lung / Top expressed in: mesenteric lymph nodes; spleen; blood; thymus; morula; submandibular gland; subcutaneous adipose tissue; embryo; primary oocyte; embryo; More reference expression data
BioGPS	More reference expression data
Gene ontology
Molecular function	MHC class II receptor activity; protein binding; MHC class II protein complex binding
Cellular component	integral component of membrane; lysosomal membrane; endosome; plasma membrane; lysosome; MHC class II protein complex; endosome membrane; membrane
Biological process	antigen processing and presentation of peptide or polysaccharide antigen via MHC class II; antigen processing and presentation; antigen processing and presentation of exogenous peptide antigen via MHC class II; immune response; negative regulation of antigen processing and presentation of peptide antigen via MHC class II; regulation of T cell differentiation; immune system process; signal transduction; adaptive immune response
Sources:Amigo / QuickGO
Orthologs
Databases	NCBI: entry; OMA: entry
Species	Human	Mouse
Entrez	3111	15001
Ensembl	ENSG00000204252; ENSG00000230141; ENSG00000232962; ENSG00000235744; ENSG00000231558 ENSG00000206292; ENSG00000232957	ENSMUSG00000024334
UniProt	P06340	n/a
RefSeq (mRNA)	NM_002119; NM_015851	NM_008206
RefSeq (protein)	NP_002110	n/a
Location (UCSC)	Chr 6: 33 – 33.01 Mb	Chr 17: 34.31 – 34.31 Mb
PubMed search
- Wikidata
View/Edit Human	View/Edit Mouse

HLA class II histocompatibility antigen, DO alpha chain is a protein that in humans is encoded by the HLA-DOA gene.

HLA-DOA belongs to the HLA class II alpha chain paralogues. HLA-DOA forms a heterodimer with HLA-DOB. The heterodimer, HLA-DO, is found in lysosomes in B cells and regulates HLA-DM-mediated peptide loading on MHC class II molecules. In comparison with classical HLA class II molecules, this gene exhibits very little sequence variation, especially at the protein level.
