= HLA-DOB =

Protein-coding gene in the species Homo sapiens

Identifiers
- Aliases: HLA-DOB, DOB, major histocompatibility complex, class II, DO beta, HLA_DOB
- External IDs: OMIM: 600629; MGI: 95925; GeneCards: HLA-DOB
Available structures
PDB	Human UniProt search: PDBe RCSB
PDB	List of PDB id codes 4I0P

Gene location (Human)
Chr.	Chromosome 6 (human)
Band	6p21.32	Start	32,812,763 bp
Band	6p21.32	End	32,820,466 bp

Gene location (Mouse)
Chr.	Chromosome 17 (mouse)
Band	17 B1|17 17.98 cM	Start	34,457,877 bp
Band	17 B1|17 17.98 cM	End	34,473,388 bp
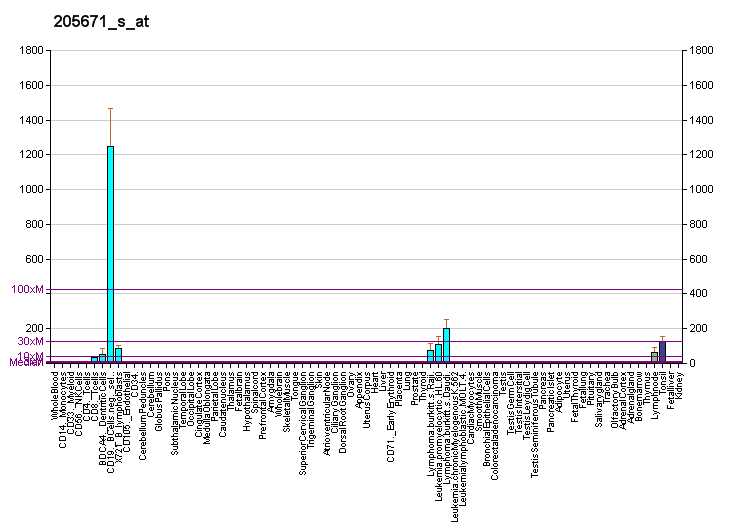
RNA expression pattern
Bgee	Human / Mouse (ortholog); Top expressed in: lymph node; spleen; appendix; granulocyte; bone marrow cell; blood; tonsil; testicle; monocyte; rectum / Top expressed in: mesenteric lymph nodes; spleen; blood; submandibular gland; subcutaneous adipose tissue; white pulp; thymus; granulocyte; embryo; bone marrow; More reference expression data
BioGPS	More reference expression data
Gene ontology
Molecular function	MHC class II receptor activity; MHC class II protein complex binding
Cellular component	lysosomal membrane; endosome membrane; lysosome; membrane; endosome; integral component of membrane; intracellular anatomical structure; MHC class II protein complex
Biological process	negative regulation of antigen processing and presentation of peptide antigen via MHC class II; antigen processing and presentation of peptide or polysaccharide antigen via MHC class II; antigen processing and presentation; immune system process; antigen processing and presentation of exogenous peptide antigen via MHC class II; immune response; signal transduction; adaptive immune response
Sources:Amigo / QuickGO
Orthologs
Databases	NCBI: entry; OMA: entry
Species	Human	Mouse
Entrez	3112	15002
Ensembl	ENSG00000243496; ENSG00000241910; ENSG00000243612; ENSG00000239457; ENSG00000241386 ENSG00000241106	ENSMUSG00000041538
UniProt	P13765	n/a
RefSeq (mRNA)	NM_002120	NM_010389
RefSeq (protein)	NP_002111	n/a
Location (UCSC)	Chr 6: 32.81 – 32.82 Mb	Chr 17: 34.46 – 34.47 Mb
PubMed search
- Wikidata
View/Edit Human	View/Edit Mouse

HLA class II histocompatibility antigen, DO beta chain is a protein that in humans is encoded by the HLA-DOB gene.

HLA-DOB belongs to the HLA class II beta chain paralogues. This class II molecule is a heterodimer consisting of an alpha (DOA) and a beta chain (DOB), both anchored in the membrane. It is located in intracellular vesicles. DO suppresses peptide loading of MHC class II molecules by inhibiting HLA-DM. Class II molecules are expressed in antigen presenting cells (APC: B lymphocytes, dendritic cells, macrophages). The beta chain is approximately 26-28 kDa and its gene contains 6 exons. Exon one encodes the leader peptide, exons 2 and 3 encode the two extracellular domains, exon 4 encodes the transmembrane domain and exon 5 encodes the cytoplasmic tail.
