= MYO1E =

Protein-coding gene in the species Homo sapiens

Identifiers
- Aliases: MYO1E, FSGS6, HuncM-IC, MYO1C, myosin IE
- External IDs: OMIM: 601479; MGI: 106621; GeneCards: MYO1E
Available structures
PDB	Ortholog search: PDBe RCSB
PDB	List of PDB id codes 2XMF

Gene location (Human)
Chr.	Chromosome 15 (human)
Band	15q22.2	Start	59,132,434 bp
Band	15q22.2	End	59,372,871 bp

Gene location (Mouse)
Chr.	Chromosome 9 (mouse)
Band	9 D|9 39.41 cM	Start	70,114,632 bp
Band	9 D|9 39.41 cM	End	70,307,048 bp
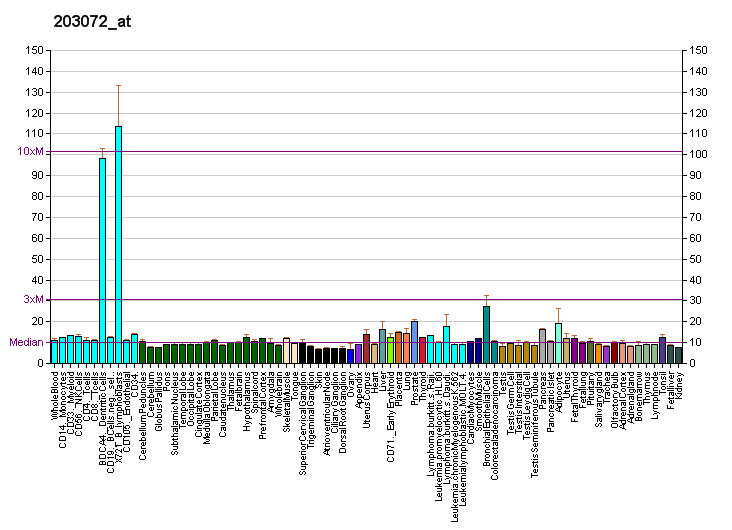
RNA expression pattern
Bgee	Human / Mouse (ortholog); Top expressed in: Achilles tendon; sural nerve; gallbladder; tibial arteries; rectum; stromal cell of endometrium; skin of leg; Descending thoracic aorta; mucosa of transverse colon; ascending aorta / Top expressed in: lumbar spinal ganglion; mesenteric lymph nodes; calvaria; left colon; lip; cumulus cell; tail of embryo; duodenum; epithelium of stomach; lacrimal gland; More reference expression data
BioGPS	More reference expression data
Gene ontology
Molecular function	nucleotide binding; calmodulin binding; actin filament binding; microfilament motor activity; protein binding; phosphatidylinositol binding; actin binding; cytoskeletal motor activity; ATP binding; lipid binding
Cellular component	cytoplasm; cell-cell junction; clathrin-coated endocytic vesicle; adherens junction; cell junction; brush border; actin cytoskeleton; extracellular exosome; cytoskeleton; cytoplasmic vesicle; clathrin-coated vesicle; myosin complex
Biological process	hemopoiesis; endocytosis; glomerular visceral epithelial cell development; glomerular basement membrane development; kidney development; post-embryonic hemopoiesis; in utero embryonic development; actin filament-based movement; vasculogenesis; nitrogen compound metabolic process; glomerular filtration; platelet-derived growth factor receptor signaling pathway; metabolism
Sources:Amigo / QuickGO
Orthologs
Databases	NCBI: entry; OMA: entry
Species	Human	Mouse
Entrez	4643	71602
Ensembl	ENSG00000157483	ENSMUSG00000032220
UniProt	Q12965	E9Q634
RefSeq (mRNA)	NM_004998	NM_181072; NM_025612
RefSeq (protein)	NP_004989	NP_851417
Location (UCSC)	Chr 15: 59.13 – 59.37 Mb	Chr 9: 70.11 – 70.31 Mb
PubMed search
- Wikidata
View/Edit Human	View/Edit Mouse

Myosin-Ie (Myo1e) is a protein that in humans is encoded by the MYO1E gene.

Myosin-Ie is a long tailed myosin. It contains an N-terminal motor domain, an IQ motif, a TH1 domain containing a plecstrin homology (PH) domain, a proline rich TH2 domain, and an SH3 domain.

The MYO1E gene was included in several genetic signatures for cancer prognosis.
