= List of Guggenheim Fellowships awarded in 1980 =

Two hundred and seventy-six scholars, artists, and scientists received Guggenheim Fellowships in 1980. $4,605,500 was disbursed between the recipients, who were chosen from an applicant pool of 2,066. Ninety-six institutions were represented. Columbia University and Harvard University had the most winners on their faculty (13), followed by Cornell University (11) and University of Washington (9).

== 1980 U.S. and Canadian Fellows ==
Category	Field of Study	Fellow	Institutional association	Research topic	Notes	Ref
Creative Arts	Choreography	Alison B. Chase	Pilobus	Choreographing		
Creative Arts	Choreography	Douglas Dunn	Douglas Dunn and Dancers	Choreographing		
Creative Arts	Choreography	Margaret Jenkins	Margaret Jenkins Dance Company	Choreographing		
Creative Arts	Choreography	Robert M. Wilson		A work for theatre	Also won in 1971	
Creative Arts	Drama & Performance Art	Romulus Linney		Playwriting		
Creative Arts	Drama & Performance Art	Jean-Claude van Itallie		Playwriting	Also won in 1973	
Creative Arts	Fiction	Nicholas Delbanco	Bennington College	Writing		
Creative Arts	Fiction	Jon Hassler	Brainerd Community College	Writing		
Creative Arts	Fiction	Ann Grace Mojtabai	Harvard University	Writing		
Creative Arts	Fiction	Mary Morris	Rutgers University	Writing		
Creative Arts	Fiction	Mary Robison	Ohio State University	Writing		
Creative Arts	Fiction	Thomas Sanchez		Book beginning "in pre-Columbian Mexico and wind[ing] up in today's Hollywood"		
Creative Arts	Fiction	Richard Yates		Writing	Also won in 1962	
Creative Arts	Fiction	Josef Škvorecký	University of Toronto	Writing		
Creative Arts	Film	Paul D. Brekke		Filmmaking		
Creative Arts	Film	Charles Burnett		Producing My Brother's Wedding		
Creative Arts	Film	Phyllis Chinlund		Filmmaking		
Creative Arts	Film	Bill Gunn		Filmmaking		
Creative Arts	Film	Douglas Nemanic		The Tamarack project		
Creative Arts	Film	Donn Alan Pennebaker	City College of New York	Filmmaking		
Creative Arts	Film	Barbara Wilk	University of Bridgeport	Animated film "by hand based on the Navajo Indians' myth of creation"		
Creative Arts	Film	Frederick Wiseman		Filmmaking		
Creative Arts	Film	Ira Wohl		Filmmaking		
Creative Arts	Fine Arts	Yee Jan Bao	University of Cincinnati (visiting)	Painting		
Creative Arts	Fine Arts	Beverly Buchanan		Sculpture: Marsh Ruins		
Creative Arts	Fine Arts	Deborah Butterfield	Montana State University	Sculpture: junkyard artwork in Jerusalem		
Creative Arts	Fine Arts	Vija Celmins	California Institute of Arts	Painting and sculpture: artwork using stones		
Creative Arts	Fine Arts	James Doolin	UCLA	Painting: desert landscapes		
Creative Arts	Fine Arts	Jene Highstein		Sculpture		
Creative Arts	Fine Arts	Tom Holland	San Francisco Art Institute	Painting		
Creative Arts	Fine Arts	Patricia Johanson		Sculpture: Partially Buried Ruins	Also won in 1970	
Creative Arts	Fine Arts	Pamela Levy		Painting		
Creative Arts	Fine Arts	Ana Mendieta	SUNY Old Westbury	Sculpture		
Creative Arts	Fine Arts	Ed Moses		Painting		
Creative Arts	Fine Arts	Stephen Pace	American University	Painting		
Creative Arts	Fine Arts	Susan Rothenberg		Painting		
Creative Arts	Fine Arts	Donald Shields	American Academy in Rome	Painting		
Creative Arts	Fine Arts	William Tucker	Columbia University School of the Arts	Sculpture		
Creative Arts	Fine Arts	DeWain Valentine		Sculpture		
Creative Arts	Music Composition	Leslie Bassett	University of Michigan	Composing	Also won in 1973	
Creative Arts	Music Composition	George Edwards	Columbia University	Composing	Also won in 1985	
Creative Arts	Music Composition	Brian Fennelly	New York University	Composing		
Creative Arts	Music Composition	Vivian Fine	Bennington College	Full-length opera based on a historic American character of the 1860s and 1870s		
Creative Arts	Music Composition	Arthur V. Kreiger	American Academy in Rome	Composing		
Creative Arts	Music Composition	Odaline de la Martinez		Sister Aimme		
Creative Arts	Music Composition	Lewis Spratlan	Amherst College	Composing		
Creative Arts	Music Composition	Alec Wilder		Composing	Grant unused - died Dec 1980	
Creative Arts	Music Composition	Ellen Taaffe Zwilich		Works including Passages		
Creative Arts	Photography	Robert Hickman Adams		Photography	Also won in 1973	
Creative Arts	Photography	William Clift		Portraits in Mount St. Michel	Also won in 1974	
Creative Arts	Photography	Robert Cumming	University of Hartford	Photography		
Creative Arts	Photography	Susan Felter	UC Santa Cruz	Documentary of the modern rodeo cowboy		
Creative Arts	Photography	Joseph D. Jachna	University of Illinois Chicago	Photography		
Creative Arts	Photography	Len Jenshel	International Center of Photography	Photography		
Creative Arts	Photography	Herbert Matter	Yale University (Emeritus)	Photography		
Creative Arts	Photography	Eugene Richards		Paid for wife's cancer treatments		
Creative Arts	Photography	Keith A. Smith	School of the Art Institute of Chicago	Photography	Also won in 1972	
Creative Arts	Photography	Hiroshi Sugimoto		Photography		
Creative Arts	Poetry	Olga Broumas	Goddard College (visiting)	Black Holes, Black Stockings (published 1985)		
Creative Arts	Poetry	Donald Davie	Vanderbilt University	Writing	Also won in 1972	
Creative Arts	Poetry	Kathleen Fraser	San Francisco State University	Writing in Rome		
Creative Arts	Poetry	Marilyn Hacker	Columbia University	Writing		
Creative Arts	Poetry	Daryl Hine		Writing		
Creative Arts	Poetry	Philip Levine	Fresno State University	Writing	Also won in 1973	
Creative Arts	Poetry	William Matthews	University of Washington	Writing		
Creative Arts	Poetry	Mary Oliver	Case Western Reserve University	Writing her fifth book of poetry		
Creative Arts	Poetry	Robert Pinsky	Harvard University (visiting)	Writing		
Creative Arts	Poetry	Gerald Stern	Somerset County College	Writing		
Creative Arts	Video & Audio	Michael Marton		Video documentary about Henry Brant		
Humanities	African Studies	Daniel P. Biebuyck	University of Delaware	Arts and cultures of Central Africa		
Humanities	African Studies	Harold Scheub	University of Wisconsin	Analytical history of ten South African literatures		
Humanities	American Literature	Ralph W. Franklin	Whitworth College	Compilation of Emily Dickinson's poetry		
Humanities	American Literature	Werner Sollors	Columbia University	Ethnicity in American literature and culture		
Humanities	American Literature	Gordon O. Taylor	University of Tulsa	American literary response to the Vietnam War		
Humanities	Architecture, Planning, & Design	David Gebhard	UC Santa Barbara	George Washington Smith and the Spanish Colonial Revival of the 1920s		
Humanities	Architecture, Planning, & Design	Martin T. Katzman	University of Texas Dallas	Changing distribution of America's population		
Humanities	Architecture, Planning, & Design	Murray Milne	UCLA	Architectural aesthetics and energy conservation		
Humanities	Biography	Stanley Olson		John Singer Sargent		
Humanities	Biography	Stuart Page Stegner	UC Santa Cruz	Robinson Jeffers		
Humanities	British History	James S. Donnelly, Jr.	University of Wisconsin	Agrarian violence and secret societies in early 19th-century Ireland		
Humanities	British History	Peter T. Marsh	Syracuse University			
Humanities	Classics	Robert Drews	Vanderbilt University			
Humanities	Classics	Peter K. Marshall	Amherst College	Critical edition of the "Letters" of Servatus Lupus		
Humanities	Classics	William H. Willis	Duke University	Compiling papers dealing with a prominent family of priests living in Egypt, 289-372		
Humanities	Dance Studies	Selma Jeanne Cohen		Dance aesthetics		
Humanities	East Asian Studies	Jerry Norman	University of Washington			
Humanities	Economic History	Stanley L. Engerman	University of Rochester	"Ideological and economic factors in the ending of slavery and serfdom and related economic and social consequences of the rise of legally free labor throughout the world during the 18th and 19th centuries"		
Humanities	Economic History	Joel Mokyr	Northwestern University			
Humanities	English Literature	James J. Gindin	University of Michigan	Critical biography of John Galsworthy		
Humanities	English Literature	James King	McMaster University	Biography of William Cowper		
Humanities	English Literature	Barbara Kiefer Lewalski	Brown University	Some Elizabethan and Jacobean patronesses	Also won in 1967	
Humanities	English Literature	John R. Maynard	New York University	Charlotte Bronte and sexuality		
Humanities	English Literature	Ian Ousby	University of Maryland, College Park	Edition of John Ruskin's correspondence with Charles Eliot Norton		
Humanities	English Literature	W. J. B. Owen	McMaster University	Writing a 14-book collection of the final version of William Wordsworth's major poem The Prelude		
Humanities	English Literature	Robert L. Patten	Rice University	Biography of George Cruikshank		
Humanities	English Literature	Robert M. Polhemus	Stanford University	Love in British fiction, from Emily Bronte to James Joyce		
Humanities	English Literature	Gary Schmidgall	University of Pennsylvania			
Humanities	English Literature	Susan Snyder	Swarthmore College	Renaissance pastoral as significant form		
Humanities	English Literature	Jon Stallworthy	Cornell University	Edition of the poetry of Wilfred Owen		
Humanities	English Literature	Susan Staves	Brandeis University	The unhappy marriage in 18th-century England		
Humanities	English Literature	James G. Turner	University of Virginia	Sexuality and literature in England, 1650-1735		
Humanities	English Literature	Martha J. Vicinus	Indiana University	Women in single-sex community and organizations in England, 1860-1920		
Humanities	Fine Arts Research	Jonathan Brown	New York University Institute of Fine Arts	El Greco and Toledo		
Humanities	Fine Arts Research	James Thomas Flexner		The World of Simon Flexner, a book about his parents, Simon and Helen	Also won in 1953	
Humanities	Fine Arts Research	Andrew Forge	Yale University	Reexamination of Monet		
Humanities	Fine Arts Research	William H. Gerdts	Brooklyn College and Graduate Center CUNY	History of painting in America		
Humanities	Fine Arts Research	Dickran L. Tashjian	UC Irvine	Cultural politics of surrealism and the American avant-garde, 1925-1950		
Humanities	Folklore & Popular Culture	John Miles Foley	University of Missouri Columbia	Old English oral epics		
Humanities	Folklore & Popular Culture	Howard Allan Norman	Boston University (visiting)	Algonquian historical, autobiographical, and mythological narrative		
Humanities	French History	Isser Woloch	Columbia University	French social order, 1789-1830		
Humanities	French History	Gordon Wright	Stanford University	Crime and punishment in modern France		
Humanities	French Literature	R. Howard Bloch	UC Berkeley	Money, marriage, and metaphor in Latin and French literature of the 12th and 13th centuries		
Humanities	French Literature	Diana Festa-McCormick	Brooklyn College	Proustian optics of clothes		
Humanities	French Literature	David Lee Rubin	University of Virginia	Formal analysis of La Fontaine's Fables		
Humanities	French Literature	Robert Franklin Storey	Temple University	Psycho-cultural study of 19th-century French pantomime		
Humanities	General Nonfiction	Jonathan Kozol		Literacy in the United States	Also won in 1970	
Humanities	General Nonfiction	Peter Marin		Conscience and the common good		
Humanities	German & Eastern European History	Roger Chickering	University of Oregon	Social and cultural aspects of the Pan-German League		
Humanities	German & Scandinavian Literature	John Francis Fetzer	UC Davis			
Humanities	German & Scandinavian Literature	Ralph Freedman	Princeton University			
Humanities	German & Scandinavian Literature	John Neubauer		Music esthetics and literary theory in the 18th century		
Humanities	History of Science & Technology	Joseph W. Dauben	Lehman College and Graduate Center CUNY	The mathematics of Charles S. Peirce		
Humanities	History of Science & Technology	David L. Hull	University of Wisconsin at Milwaukee			
Humanities	Iberian & Latin American History	Warren Dean	New York University			
Humanities	Iberian & Latin American History	Herbert S. Klein	Columbia University			
Humanities	Linguistics	Anatoly Liberman	University of Minnesota	West German accentology		
Humanities	Linguistics	Thomas A. Sebeok	Indiana University	Clever Hans effect in man-animal and human communication	Also won in 1958	
Humanities	Literary Criticism	Charles Altieri	UC Berkeley			
Humanities	Literary Criticism	Lawrence Lipking	Northwestern University			
Humanities	Literary Criticism	James Olney	North Carolina Central University	Relationship between autobiographers and their cultures		
Humanities	Literary Criticism	Hayden White	UC Santa Cruz			
Humanities	Medieval History	Paul Meyvaert	Mediaeval Academy of America	Critical edition of Gregory the Great's Libellus Responsionum		
Humanities	Medieval Literature	Jane Chance Nitzsche	Rice University	Mythology as interpreted by Christian scholars of the Middle Ages		
Humanities	Medieval Literature	Russell Peck	University of Rochester	Chaucer's scientific and philosophical writings and their relationship to Chaucer's poetry		
Humanities	Music Research	Dimitri Conomos	University of British Columbia			
Humanities	Music Research	Frank A. D'Accone	UCLA			
Humanities	Music Research	Allen Forte	Yale University			
Humanities	Music Research	Marian McPartland		Women in jazz		
Humanities	Near Eastern Studies	Michael W. Dols	California State University, Hayward	Development of a treatise on madmen in medieval Muslim society		
Humanities	Near Eastern Studies	Mordechai A. Friedman	Tel Aviv University			
Humanities	Philosophy	Jasper Hopkins, Jr.	University of Minnesota	Nicolas of Cusa's metaphysic of contraction		
Humanities	Philosophy	Henry E. Kyburg, Jr.	University of Rochester	Linguistic and theoretical change, specifically the phenomenon whereby theoretical change in science is often accompanied by linguistic change		
Humanities	Philosophy	Martha C. Nussbaum	Harvard University	Contingency and rational self-sufficiency in Greek ethical thought		
Humanities	Philosophy	Elliott R. Sober	University of Wisconsin	Philosophical aspects of evolutionary theory		
Humanities	Religion	Hans W. Frei	Yale University	David Strauss		
Humanities	Religion	John F. Wilson	Princeton University			
Humanities	Renaissance History	Richard A. Goldthwaite	Johns Hopkins University	Social and economic history of art in pre-industrial Europe		
Humanities	Renaissance History	Gordon L. Kipling	UCLA	Renaissance triumphal processions, 1370-1700		
Humanities	Renaissance History	John Monfasani	SUNY Albany	Culture of the Augustinian Order in the Renaissance and Reformation		
Humanities	Russian History	Robert V. Daniels	University of Vermont	Russian Revolution and its legacy		
Humanities	Russian History	Gregory L. Freeze	Brandeis University	Emancipation of the Russian parish clergy, 1825-1890		
Humanities	Science Writing	Gerald Holton	Massachusetts Institute of Technology (visiting)	Measure for assessing the impacts of science on society		
Humanities	South Asian Studies	Wendy Doniger O'Flaherty	University of Chicago	Folklore and psychology in the Jaiminiya Brahmana		
Humanities	Slavic Literature	Patricia Blake		Edition of Max Hayward's writings on contemporary Russian literature		
Humanities	Slavic Literature	John E. Malmstad	Harvard University			
Humanities	Spanish & Portuguese Literature	Antonio Sánchez-Romeralo	UC Davis	Edition of Juan Ramón Jiménez's Ideolojía		
Humanities	Theatre Arts	Kristin Linklater	Shakespeare & Company (Massachusetts)	Development of classical theater training methods		
Humanities	Theatre Arts	Daniel J. Watermeier	SUNY Plattsburgh	Biography on Edwin Booth		
Humanities	United States History	Thomas Bender	New York University	Intellectual life and public culture of NYC, 1850-1950		
Humanities	United States History	Vincent P. Carosso	New York University			
Humanities	United States History	William J. Cooper Jr.	Louisiana State University			
Humanities	United States History	Robert Griffith	University of Massachusetts Amherst	Emergence of contemporary America, 1945-1960		
Humanities	United States History	Gerald N. Grob	Rutgers University	Retrospective look at the way America has responded to the problem of mental illness		
Humanities	United States History	Michael Kammen	Cornell University	Role of tradition in American culture, 1870-1980		
Humanities	United States History	John L. Kessell				
Humanities	United States History	Gerda Lerner	University of Wisconsin-Madison			
Humanities	United States History	Sydney Nathans	Duke University	Black rural settlement in the South, 1840-1970		
Humanities	United States History	Marc Simmons		Hispanic agriculture in New Mexico		
Humanities	United States History	Maris A. Vinovskis	University of Michigan	Death and dying in Civil War America		
Humanities	United States History	Gordon S. Wood	Brown University	Democratization of American culture from the Revolution to the age of Andrew Jackson		
Natural Sciences	Applied Mathematics	Philip L.-F. Liu	Cornell University	Wave hydrodynamics		
Natural Sciences	Applied Mathematics	Robert M. Miura	University of British Columbia	Nonlinear diffusion equations in neurophysiology		
Natural Sciences	Applied Mathematics	David N. Seidman	Cornell University	Point defects in semiconductors	Also won in 1972	
Natural Sciences	Applied Mathematics	Michael J. Todd	Cornell University	Numerical techniques for solving nonlinear equations		
Natural Sciences	Applied Mathematics	James A. Yorke	University of Maryland, College Park	Mathematical epidemiology and continuation techniques		
Natural Sciences	Astronomy & Astrophysics	Marshall H. Cohen	California Institute of Technology		Also won in 1960	
Natural Sciences	Astronomy & Astrophysics	David L. Lambert	University of Texas Austin			
Natural Sciences	Astronomy & Astrophysics	Gordon H. Pettengill	Massachusetts Institute of Technology	Radio emission from Uranus and Neptune		
Natural Sciences	Astronomy & Astrophysics	Henry L. Shipman	University of Delaware	Late stages of stellar evolution		
Natural Sciences	Chemistry	Donald R. Arnold	Dalhousie University	Radical ions in photochemistry		
Natural Sciences	Chemistry	Jerome A. Berson	Yale University	Mechanistic organic chemistry		
Natural Sciences	Chemistry	Frederick G. Bordwell	Northwestern University			
Natural Sciences	Chemistry	Stanley J. Cristol	University of Colorado Boulder		Also won in 1955	
Natural Sciences	Chemistry	David Dolphin	University of British Columbia			
Natural Sciences	Chemistry	David Cregeen Frost	University of British Columbia	Photoelectron spectroscopy		
Natural Sciences	Chemistry	Yoshito Kishi	Harvard University	Synthesis of complex natural products		
Natural Sciences	Chemistry	Walter G. Klemperer	Columbia University			
Natural Sciences	Chemistry	James T. Muckerman	Brookhaven National Laboratory	Dimensionality in model problems of molecular dynamics		
Natural Sciences	Chemistry	Royce W. Murray	University of North Carolina	Electrochemistry that could have an impact on alternative energy supplies		
Natural Sciences	Chemistry	Kenneth N. Raymond	UC Berkeley	Attempting to isolate poisonous metal ions by making molecules that will wrap around the toxic metal ions		
Natural Sciences	Chemistry	Victor E. Viola	University of Maryland			
Natural Sciences	Computer Science	Douglas Hofstadter	Indiana University	Computer aesthetics in typeface design		
Natural Sciences	Earth Science	Dennis E. Hayes	Columbia University	Global study of oceanic depth anomalies		
Natural Sciences	Earth Science	C. Vance Haynes	University of Arizona	Early man in the San Pedro Valley to construct a picture of life there 11,000 years ago		
Natural Sciences	Earth Science	Steven M. Stanley	Johns Hopkins University			
Natural Sciences	Mathematics	David V. Chudnovsky	Columbia University	Classical and quantum field theories		
Natural Sciences	Mathematics	Gregory V. Chudnovsky	Columbia University	Analytic methods in transcendental number theory		
Natural Sciences	Mathematics	Ronald G. Douglas	SUNY Stony Brook	Index theorems and operator theory		
Natural Sciences	Mathematics	William Fulton	Brown University	Intersection theory in algebraic geometry		
Natural Sciences	Mathematics	Phillip A. Griffiths	Harvard University	Algebraic geometry and complex analysis		
Natural Sciences	Mathematics	Victor Klee Jr.	University of Washington	Studies in convexity, combinatorics, and computational complexity		
Natural Sciences	Mathematics	Ravi S. Kulkarni	Indiana University Bloomington	Discrete groups in geometry and typology		
Natural Sciences	Mathematics	Moss E. Sweedler	Cornell University	Algebraic groups		
Natural Sciences	Mathematics	Shing-Tung Yau	Stanford University	Behavior of the Monge-Ampère equation		
Natural Sciences	Medicine & Health	William P. Arend	University of Washington	Research at Strangeways Research Laboratory and Corpus Christi College, Cambridge		
Natural Sciences	Medicine & Health	Karl Y. Hostetler	UC San Diego	Biochemistry of lipids		
Natural Sciences	Medicine & Health	Jay Katz	Yale Law School	Disclosure and consent in physician-patient and lawyer-client relationships		
Natural Sciences	Medicine & Health	Michael L. Steer	Harvard Medical School	Mechanism of hormone regulation of platelet activity		
Natural Sciences	Medicine & Health	Emil R. Unanue	Harvard Medical School	Biochemical and structural analysis of the lymphocyte cell membrane		
Natural Sciences	Molecular & Cellular Biology	John N. Abelson	UC San Diego	Mechanism of gene expression in higher organisms		
Natural Sciences	Molecular & Cellular Biology	Thomas Blumenthal	Indiana University	Analysis of suppressor mutations		
Natural Sciences	Molecular & Cellular Biology	Marvin H. Caruthers	University of Colorado Boulder			
Natural Sciences	Molecular & Cellular Biology	James J. Champoux	University of Washington			
Natural Sciences	Molecular & Cellular Biology	Roderick K. Clayton	Cornell University	Physico-chemical studies in photosynthesis	Also won in 1973	
Natural Sciences	Molecular & Cellular Biology	Michael Freeling	UC Berkeley	How genes work during the development of plants		
Natural Sciences	Molecular & Cellular Biology	Ross J. MacIntyre	Cornell University	Genetic regulation of enzymes		
Natural Sciences	Molecular & Cellular Biology	Harold J. Morowitz	Yale University	History of science		
Natural Sciences	Molecular & Cellular Biology	Florante A. Quiocho	Rice University	Biochemistry		
Natural Sciences	Organismic Biology & Ecology	Marc Bekoff	University of Colorado Boulder	Social play behavior		
Natural Sciences	Organismic Biology & Ecology	William M. Lewis, Jr.	University of Colorado Boulder			
Natural Sciences	Organismic Biology & Ecology	Richard R. Strathmann	University of Washington	Larval feeding		
Natural Sciences	Organismic Biology & Ecology	Richard Tracy	Colorado State University	Zoology		
Natural Sciences	Physics	Joseph L. Birman	Graduate Center CUNY			
Natural Sciences	Physics	Elias Burstein	University of Pennsylvania	Absorbed molecules on metal surfaces		
Natural Sciences	Physics	Norval Fortson	University of Washington	Research at Oxford University		
Natural Sciences	Physics	Louis Neff Hand	Cornell University	Detection of short-lived particles		
Natural Sciences	Physics	Homer Neal	Indiana University	Electron-positron interactions on high energies		
Natural Sciences	Physics	T. Michael Sanders, Jr.	University of Michigan	Experiments on small crystals		
Natural Sciences	Physics	Zoltán G. Soos	Princeton University			
Natural Sciences	Physics	John C. Wheatley	UC San Diego	Properties of liquids working in heat engines	Also won in 1954	
Natural Sciences	Physics	William H. Wing	University of Arizona	Properties of the simplest atoms and molecules		
Natural Sciences	Plant Science	Donald E. Aylor	Connecticut Agricultural Experiment Station	Physics of fungal spore dispersal		
Natural Sciences	Statistics	Charles J. Stone	UCLA	Statistical theory and methodology		
Social Sciences	Anthropology and Cultural Studies	Paul J. Bohannan	UC Santa Barbara	Cross-cultural approach to divorce in the United States, 1964-1980		
Social Sciences	Anthropology and Cultural Studies	James L. Peacock III	University of North Carolina	Religious traditions in the South; also, general work on the theory of culture		
Social Sciences	Anthropology and Cultural Studies	Paul Rabinow	UC Berkeley	French colonial cities as political and aesthetic experiments		
Social Sciences	Anthropology and Cultural Studies	Anya Peterson Royce	Indiana University	Comparison of the form and context of dance and mime		
Social Sciences	Anthropology and Cultural Studies	James T. Siegel	Cornell University	Place of imagery in Japanese culture		
Social Sciences	Anthropology and Cultural Studies	Jan M. Vansina	University of Wisconsin	Social dynamics of African precolonial societies		
Social Sciences	Anthropology and Cultural Studies	R. Tom Zuidema	University of Illinois Urbana-Champaign	Inca culture in the valley of Cuzco, Peru		
Social Sciences	Economics	Jagdish N. Bhagwati	Massachusetts Institute of Technology	Economics of international migration		
Social Sciences	Economics	Samuel Bowles	University of Massachusetts Amherst	Relationship between democratic politics and economic growth		
Social Sciences	Economics	Guillermo A. Calvo	Columbia University			
Social Sciences	Economics	John S. Chipman	University of Minnesota	Theoretical development and econometric application of a model of international trade		
Social Sciences	Economics	Robert J. Gordon	Northwestern University	Book: Measurement of Durable Goods Prices		
Social Sciences	Economics	Eric Maskin	Massachusetts Institute of Technology	Incentives and public choice		
Social Sciences	Education	Robbie Case	Ontario Institute for Studies in Education			
Social Sciences	Education	Seymour A. Papert	Massachusetts Institute of Technology	Role of computers in shaping learning environments		
Social Sciences	Geography & Environmental Studies	Kenneth Ruddle	National Museum of Ethnology			
Social Sciences	Geography & Environmental Studies	Wilbur Zelinsky	Pennsylvania State University	The modern nation-state and the manipulation of cultural symbols		
Social Sciences	Law	Morton J. Horwitz	Harvard Law School	Development of American legal thought, 1870-1960		
Social Sciences	Law	Peter Westen	University of Michigan Law School	Contractual agreements between criminal defendants and the state		
Social Sciences	Political Science	Benjamin R. Barber	Rutgers University	Political theory of the drama		
Social Sciences	Political Science	Herman Belz	University of Maryland			
Social Sciences	Political Science	Daniel J. Elazar	Temple University	Covenant idea and the western political tradition	Also won in 1964	
Social Sciences	Political Science	Donald L. Horowitz	Smithsonian Institution	Ethnic violence in Asia and Africa		
Social Sciences	Political Science	Robert W. Jackman	Michigan State University	Political instability in third-world countries		
Social Sciences	Political Science	Donald R. Matthews	University of Washington	Selection of political executives in Norway		
Social Sciences	Political Science	Sidney Verba	Harvard University	Comparative study of attitudes toward equality		
Social Sciences	Political Science	Jack L. Walker	University of Michigan	Origins and maintenance of interest groups in America		
Social Sciences	Psychology	Russell Jacoby	UC Irvine (visiting)	Intellectual biography of Otto Fenichel		
Social Sciences	Psychology	Herbert C. Kelman	Harvard University	Legitimate authority and individual responsibility		
Social Sciences	Psychology	Ellen Langer	Harvard University	Consequences of reduced cognitive activity		
Social Sciences	Psychology	R. Duncan Luce	Harvard University	Reaction time distributions in analyzing mental processes		
Social Sciences	Psychology	Marilyn Shatz	University of Michigan	Theoretical analysis of the development of communication skills		
Social Sciences	Psychology	Sara J. Shettleworth	University of Toronto	Research at Oxford University		
Social Sciences	Sociology	Howard Schuman	University of Michigan	Changes in racial attitudes in the United States over five decades		
Social Sciences	Sociology	Michael H. Schwartz	SUNY Stony Brook	Power structure of American business		
Social Sciences	Sociology	Sherry Turkle	Massachusetts Institute of Technology	The computer as a cultural object		
Social Sciences	Sociology	Robert S. Weiss	University of Massachusetts Boston and Harvard Medical School	Attachment in adult life		
Social Sciences	Sociology	Harriet Zuckerman	Columbia University	Differences in research performance between men and women scientists and scholars		

== 1980 Latin American and Caribbean Fellows ==
Category	Field of Study	Fellow	Institutional association	Research topic	Notes	Ref
Creative Arts	Fiction	Earl Wilbert Lovelace	University of the West Indies	Writing		
Creative Arts	Fiction	Fernando del Paso		Writing	Also won in 1970	
Creative Arts	Film	Carlos Alberto Lersundy		Filmmaking		
Creative Arts	Fine Arts	Denzil H. Hurley	Yale School of Art	Painting and printmaking		
Creative Arts	Fine Arts	Brian Nissen		Painting		
Creative Arts	Fine Arts	Catalina Parra Troncoso		Visual art		
Creative Arts	Fine Arts	Liliana Porter	Porter-Wiener Studio	Painting and printmaking		
Creative Arts	Fine Arts	Regina Vater		Visual art: Amazon mythologies		
Creative Arts	Photography	Marcos Santilli		Nharamaã project of audio-photographic documentation of colonization in Rondônia		
Creative Arts	Poetry	Abelardo Sánchez-León	Centro de Estudios y Promoción del Desarrollo (DESCO)	Writing		
Humanities	American Literature	Alejandro Oliveros		Wrote Imagen, objetividad y confesión (published 1991)		
Humanities	Iberian & Latin American History	Waldemar Espinoza Soriano	National University of San Marcos	Research in Peru, Bolivia, and Argentina		
Humanities	Latin American Literature	Augusto Tamayo Vargas	National University of San Marcos			
Humanities	Philosophy	Roberto Torretti	University of Puerto Rico		Also won in 1974	
Natural Sciences	Earth Science	Félix González Bonorino	Bariloche Foundation	Structural geology of South American cordilleras	Also won in 1954	
Natural Sciences	Earth Science	Francisco Hervé	University of Chile			
Natural Sciences	Medicine & Health	Jorge Alberto Tadeo Blaquier	University of Buenos Aires School of Medicine and CONICET	Biochemical studies in male reproductive physiology		
Natural Sciences	Medicine & Health	Juan José Gagliardino	National University of La Plata	Regulation of insulin secretion		
Natural Sciences	Molecular & Cellular Biology	Néstor Fadrique González-Cadavid	Central University of Venezuela	Molecular biology of mitochondrial respiratory enzymes		
Natural Sciences	Molecular & Cellular Biology	Luis A. Jiménez de Asúa	Friedrich Miescher Institute for Biomedical Research	Mechanisms of growth control in cultured mammalian cells	Also won in 1972	
Natural Sciences	Molecular & Cellular Biology	Isaura Meza	CINVESTAV	Isolation and characterization of the tubulin gene		
Natural Sciences	Neuroscience	René Drucker-Colín	National Autonomous University of Mexico	Neurophysiology of sleep		
Natural Sciences	Physics	Feliciano Sánchez Sinencio	CINVESTAV			
Natural Sciences	Plant Sciences	Juan Héctor Hunziker	CONICET and University of Buenos Aires	Plant cytogenetics, systematics, and evolution	Also won in 1957 and 1958	
Social Sciences	Anthropology & Cultural Studies	Jorge E. Dandler	University of San Andrés			

== See also ==
- Guggenheim Fellowship
- List of Guggenheim Fellowships awarded in 1979
- List of Guggenheim Fellowships awarded in 1981
