= Feliciano Sánchez Sinencio =

Mexican physicist (b. 1938)

- Born: December 3, 1938
- Other names: Feliciano Sánchez-Sinencio
- Education: National Polytechnic Institute (IPN); University of São Paulo
- Relatives: Edgar Sánchez-Sinencio (brother)
- Awards: National Prize for Sciences (1997); Guggenheim Fellowship (1980)
- Scientific career
- Fields: Semiconductor physics
- Institutions: National Polytechnic Institute (IPN); Center for Research and Advanced Studies; Latin-American Physics Center

Feliciano Sánchez Sinencio (México City, December 3, 1938) is a Mexican electronic engineer, researcher, professor, and scholar. He has specialized in semiconductor physics.

== Studies ==
He obtained a degree in electrical communications and electronics engineering in the Superior School of Mechanical and Electrical Engineering (ESIME), at the National Polytechnic Institute (Instituto Politécnico Nacional). He completed a master's degree in physics at the Brazilian Institute for Physics Research (Centro Brasileiro de Pesquisas Físicas) and a Ph.D. at the University of São Paulo.

== Academia ==
He has been a researcher and director of the Research Center for Applied Science and Advanced Technology (CICATA) and the Center for Research and Advanced Studies of the National Polytechnic Institute (Cinvestav).

He has conducted research on electronic transport in sulfur crystals and polycrystalline semiconductor materials. He is considered an expert in the construction of solar cells. He carried out studies on the mechanical, thermal, and nutritional properties of corn flour in the nixtamalization process. He discovered the properties of oxygenated amorphous cadmium telluride as an insulating semiconductor. He has worked on the development of new experimental techniques to measure very small amounts of pollutants in the atmosphere.

He was director of the Latin-American Physics Center (Centro Latinoamericano de Física) with headquarters in Rio de Janeiro, Brazil between 2004 and 2012. He was president of the Mexican Society for the Advancement of Science and Technology (Sociedad Mexicana para el Progreso de la Ciencia y Tecnología). He is a member of the Mexican Society of Physics, the Brazilian Society of Physics, the American Association for the Advancement of Science, the Mexican Academy of Sciences and the Advisory Council of Science of the Presidency of the Mexican Republic.

He has been a visiting professor at the Hebrew University of Jerusalem and at Princeton University.

He has published over 150 scientific articles and has been cited more than 380 times. He is the author of 4 patents in Mexico and 7 in the United States.

== Awards and recognition ==
- Guggenheim Fellowship awarded by the John Simon Guggenheim Memorial Foundation in 1980.
- Medal from the Cuban Academy of Sciences in 1992.
- Award for the Development of Physics in Mexico, granted by the Mexican Society of Physics in 1994.
- National Prize for Sciences in the area of Technology and Design, the highest national award for scientists by the Mexican Government. It was granted through the Secretariat of Public Education in 1997.
- Honorary Citizen Award of São Carlos, São Paulo, Brazil, in 2007.
- Heberto Castillo Martínez Capital City Award, granted by the Institute of Science and Technology of the Mexico City Government in 2008.
- Merit Medal in Science and Arts, awarded by the Congress of Mexico City in 2008.
- Scientific Research Award, granted by the Mexican Society of Surfaces and Vacuum.
- Lázaro Cárdenas Medal, awarded by the National Polytechnic Institute.
- Emeritus Researcher at Center for Research and Advanced Studies (Cinvestav) since 2011.
- Honorary Doctorate in physical sciences from the University of Havana in 2012.
- Luis Elizondo Award, granted by the Monterrey Institute of Technology and Higher Education in 2012.
- Life trajectory Recognition by the CINVESTAV in 2016.
