= Zoot Suit (disambiguation) =

A zoot suit is a style of clothing first popular in the 1930s and 1940s.

Zoot suit may also refer to:

- Zoot Suit (play), a 1979 Broadway play by Luis Valdez
  - Zoot Suit (film), a 1981 filmed version of the play
- "Zoot Suit" (song), a 1964 song by the High Numbers, an alternate name for the Who

== See also ==
- The Zoot Suit Murders, 1978 murder mystery by Thomas Sanchez
- Zoot Suit Riots, a series of conflicts in June 1943 in Los Angeles, California, United States
- Zoot Suit Riot (album), by the Cherry Poppin' Daddies
  - "Zoot Suit Riot" (song), the album's title song
- Zoot (disambiguation)
