= Academic rankings of universities in Mexico =

Academic rankings of universities in Mexico are listings of universities and institutions of higher education in the country that has been sorted according to different criteria of evaluation. The ratings may be based on the "subjective quality perceived", in a certain combination of empirical statistics, bibliometric statistics or examinations by teachers, students or others. These classifications are often consulted by applicants to obtain a place at a university and choose one according to personal criteria.

== Bibliometric rankings ==
The bibliometrics is a part of the scientometry that applies mathematical and statistical methods to the entire scientific literature and the authors who produce it, with the aim of studying and analyzing scientific activity. In the bibliometric rankings, the most common criteria include the citation analysis, the impact of specialized magazines and the number of publications in refereed journals. However, the classifications based on production of documents or scientific activity generally do not apply corrections by establishment size, so its tend to be biased to favor large universities that produce a larger mass of research papers. Additionally, the rankings based on scientific publications do not directly measure the quality of teaching and learning outcomes of students. Consequently, some small educational institutions or no focused to research are listed as poor quality, or not appear at all, despite enjoying high reputation in professional circles.

=== Performance Ranking of Scientific Papers for World Universities ===
The Performance Ranking of Scientific Papers for World Universities measured productivity, research impact and the excellence of the research conducted by universities and is made by the Higher Education Evaluation and Accreditation Council of Taiwan. In the 2011 edition only one Mexican university appears internationally:

International position 2011	Position in Latin America 2011	College	
233	2	National Autonomous University of Mexico	-

=== Academic Ranking of World Universities ===
The Academic Ranking of World Universities is prepared by the Institute of Higher Education of Jiao Tong University of Shanghai, China, to identify the disparities between Chinese universities with the rest of the world, particularly in terms of academic performance and research. It is one of the classifications more worldwide known, this is a list compiled by a group of specialists in bibliometrics of Jiao Tong University. This list includes the major institutions of college in the world and are sorted according to a formula that takes into account: the number of awarded with the Nobel Prize or Fields Medal either retired of the college (10%) or assets in the same (20%), the number of researchers highly cited in 21 general subjects (20%), number of articles published in the scientific journals Science and Nature (20%), the number of academic papers recorded in the indices of the Science Citation Index and the Social Science Citation Index (20%) and finally the "performance per capita", i.e. the score of all the above indicators divided by the number of full-time academics (10%). In this classification, the only Mexican institution among the top 500 universities in the world is:

International position 2010	Position in Latin America 2010	College
151–200	2	National Autonomous University of Mexico

=== Comparative Study of Mexican universities, ECUM ===
The Comparative study of Mexican Universities (ECUM) is a research project that aims to compare the performance of Mexican universities and other higher education institutions. It is based on the collection, systematization and analysis of information common to all institutions, collected from official sources and recognized data bases. According to the study (2011), the 10 Mexican universities with highest scientific production in articles indexed by the ISI Web of Knowledge are:

Number of publications	National percentage	Institution of higher education
3142	32.1	National Autonomous University of Mexico
847	8.6	CINVESTAV
787	8.0	Instituto Politécnico Nacional
582	5.9	Universidad Autónoma Metropolitana
329	3.4	University of Guadalajara
326	3.3	Autonomous University of Nuevo León
283	2.9	Meritorious Autonomous University of Puebla
228	2.3	Colegio de Postgraduados
213	2.2	Autonomous University of San Luis Potosí

=== Ibero-American Ranking SIR 2012 ===
The Ibero-American Ranking SIR 2012, prepared by the SCImago Research Group of University of Granada, analyzes all the scientific production present in the Scopus database developed by Elsevier in 2006-2010 and associates each publication and each citation found to the institution or institutions concerned. According to the study, in that period, the five Mexican institutions with higher production were:

National position	Position in Latin America	Institution of higher education
1	2	National Autonomous University of Mexico
2	11	CINVESTAV
3	16	Instituto Politécnico Nacional
4	27	Universidad Autónoma Metropolitana
5	44	University of Guadalajara

== Rankings based on other statistical counts ==
Unlike of the classifications with approach bibliometric, these classifications quantify a factor or a different element to refereed scientific publications; for example, the number of winners with an award of the highest international prestige, the number of executives running a world-class company or the volume of published content in the World Wide Web.

=== Professional Ranking of World Universities ===
The Professional Ranking of World Universities is prepared by the École nationale supérieure des mines de Paris and measures the number of graduates who run one of the 500 most powerful companies in the world according to Fortune magazine. In 2010 there were two Mexican universities ranked among the 392 best in the world:

International position 2010	College
92	Anáhuac University
349	Autonomous Technological Institute of Mexico

=== Web Ranking of World Universities ===
This classification is made by the Center for Information and Documentation (CINDOC) of Spanish National Research Council (CSIC) of Spain and takes into account the volume of published contents in the Web, and the visibility and impact of these contents according to external links pointing to its sites.

According to its website, "The original aim of the Ranking was to promote the Web publication and not to obtain a list of academic and research institutions according to its prestige. Our first aim is to support the initiatives" Open Access "and to promote the electronic access to scientific publications and all those other academic material." In July 2010, the five best classified Mexican universities were:

National position 2010	International position 2010	Institution	Position in Latin America 2010
1	70	National Autonomous University of Mexico	1
2	460	Autonomous University of Mexico State	
3	653	Autonomous University of Nuevo León	
4	698	Universidad Autónoma Metropolitana	
5	948	Monterrey Institute of Technology and Higher Education	

== Subjective rankings ==
As the name suggests, these rankings often reflect the weighted average of the opinions gathered in a survey, which often include members of the business community and whose seriousness and methodological rigor varies according to the source.

=== THES - QS World University Rankings ===
The World University Rankings Top Universities, is made by the company Quacquarelli Symonds. For its elaboration the following weights are taken into account: 40% survey among peers, 10% survey among recruiters, 5% numbers of international students, 5% number of international teachers, 20% teacher ratio: student and 20% refereed citations. According to the latest version (2012) appear only two Mexican universities ranked among the 500 best universities in the world:

International position 2012	College
146	National Autonomous University of Mexico
306	Monterrey Institute of Technology and Higher Education
