= Isaura Meza =

Mexican microbiologist

- Born: 11 May 1942 (age 84); Mexico City, Mexico
- Occupation: Microbiologist
- Awards: Guggenheim Fellowship (1980)

Academic background
- Education: National Autonomous University of Mexico; CINVESTAV; University of California, Berkeley
- Thesis: Studies on the chemistry and structure of sea urchin microtubules (1972)

Isaura Meza Gómez-Palacio (born 11 May 1942) is a Mexican microbiologist who specialises in eukaryotic cytoskeletal protein genes. A 1980 Guggenheim Fellow, she worked as a professor and researcher at CINVESTAV.

== Biography ==
She was born on 11 May 1942 in Mexico City. She obtained her licentiate in biology from the National Autonomous University of Mexico in 1964 and her master of science degree from CINVESTAV in 1967. After spending a year as a research fellow at Oak Ridge National Laboratory (1966-1967) and a year of study at University of Wisconsin–Madison (1968–1969), she obtained her PhD in Zoology from University of California, Berkeley in 1972; her dissertation was titled Studies on the chemistry and structure of sea urchin microtubules.

She worked at UCB as a research fellow and teaching assistant from 1969 until 1972, when she moved to the University of Geneva to become a postdoctoral fellow. In 1974, she left Geneva and returned to CINVESTAV to become assistant professor of cell biology; she was promoted to associate professor in 1975, before eventually being promoted to researcher emeritus.

She focuses on eukaryotic cytoskeletal protein genes. Her work group at UCB was among the first to describe the protein organization of the structures that enable sperm flagella to move for egg fertilization. In 1980, she was awarded a Guggenheim Fellowship to study tubulin genetics. In 2017, she led a research team identifying BIRC3 for breast cancer treatment.

She co-authored a popular science book named Máquinas vivientes (lit. 'Living machines').

Mirna Servín said that her work "laid the foundations for what later became a boom in molecular biology studies of these parasites". Xochitl Pilli Rodríguez Flores called her "a pioneer in the study of the amoeba cytoskeleton in our country [Mexico]". In 2013, she was awarded the Omecíhuatl Medal.
