= Zoot =

Zoot may refer to:

- Zoot Comics, a 1946–1948 Fox Features Syndicate comic book featuring Rulah, Jungle Goddess
- Zoot (band), an Australian pop group active 1965–1971
- Zoot!, a 1956 album by saxophonist Zoot Sims
- Zoot suit, a style of clothing first popular in the 1930s and 1940s
- Zoot, a game on the MSX platform, released by Bug Byte software in 1986
- Zoot, a slang term for a cannabis cigarette

== People ==
- Zoot Sims (born John Haley Sims; 1925–1985), American jazz saxophonist
- Zoot Money (born George Bruno Money; 1942–2024), British vocalist, keyboardist and bandleader

== Characters ==
- Zoot, a balding saxophonist character in the fictional Muppet band Dr. Teeth and the Electric Mayhem
- Zoot, a character in the film Monty Python and the Holy Grail
- Zoot, a synthetic suit in My Favorite Martian
- Zoot, a character in the webcomic Loxie & Zoot
- Zoot, a character in the series The Tribe

== See also ==
- Zoot Suit (disambiguation)
