= Robert Griffith (historian) =

American historian (1940–2011)

- Born: October 17, 1940; Atlanta, Georgia, U.S.
- Died: January 25, 2011 (aged 70); Silver Spring, Maryland, U.S.
- Education: DePauw University
- Occupations: Historian, professor
- Employer: American University

Robert W. Griffith (October 17, 1940 – January 25, 2011) was an American historian.

== Life ==
Robert W. Griffith was born in Atlanta, Georgia, and grew up in Evansville, Indiana. He graduated from DePauw University, 1964, and received his M.A. and Ph.D. from the University of Wisconsin, 1967, where he was a Woodrow Wilson Fellow. He taught at the University of Georgia, and at the University of Massachusetts Amherst. He was Dean of the College of Arts and Humanities at the University of Maryland. He taught history and was chair of the history department at American University.

His work has appeared in the American Historical Review, the Journal of American History, Reviews in American History, and Business History Review.

He signed the "Resolution on United States Government Practices Inimical to the Values of the Historical Profession".

He served on the board of editors of the Journal of American History. He served as treasurer of the Organization of American Historians until stepping down January 1, 2011 for health reasons.

Griffith died on January 25, 2011, due to complications from Hodgkin's lymphoma.

== Awards ==
- 1970 Frederick Jackson Turner Award
- 1980 Guggenheim Fellowship
- National Endowment for the Humanities Fellowship
- Harry S. Truman Library Institute Fellowship

== Works ==
- "Un-Tangling the Web of Cold War Studies; or, How One Historian Stopped Worrying and Learned to Love the Internet", Journal of Multi-Media History, Vol. 3, 2000
- "Truman and the Historians", April 1974
- The Politics of Fear: Joseph R. McCarthy and the Senate. University of Massachusetts Press. 1987. ISBN 978-0-87023-555-9. (1st edition 1970)

=== Editor ===
- The Specter: Original Essays on McCarthyism and the Cold War (1974)
- Dwight David Eisenhower; Everett E. Hazlett (1984). Robert Griffith (ed.). Ike's Letters to a Friend: 1941-1958. Photographer Everett E. Hazlett. University Press of Kansas. ISBN 978-0-7006-0257-5.
- Robert Griffith; Paula Baker, eds. (December 1991). Major Problems in American History Since 1945. D. C. Heath & Co. ISBN 978-0-669-19625-2. (2nd edition January, 2001; 3rd edition January 2007)
