= CICATA Querétaro =

CICATA Querétaro is the Research Center for Applied Science and Advance Technology of the National Polytechnic Institute (IPN) located in Querétaro. It was established on June 30, 2005, by an agreement of the IPN Consultive General Council. Although, it started to operate as an independent academic unit in 2001, when Adrián García García was appointed Acting Director. Its current building was inaugurated on November 6, 2006. On January 1, 2008, its master and doctor degree programs were certified by the National Research Council for Science and Technology (CONACYT).

== History ==
At the beginning, CICATA Querétaro was one of the five different units that CICATA had around the country. Then, on June 30, 2005, it was declared a Responsible Unit. However, since 2001, Adrian García was serving as its Acting Director. CICATA Querétaro current facilities were inaugurated on November 6, 2006. Before that, CICATA Querétaro has been renting facilities.

== Educational Services ==
Currently, CICATA Querétaro offers a master and a doctor degree programs. Both of them are certified by the CONACYT. The master's degree program at Consolidated level and the doctor one at In Development level.

== Research ==
CICATA Querétaro has 18 members of the National Research System of CONACYT.

== Liaison ==
Although its liaison is established using regular transactional agreements. A distinctive framework is given by what it has been called the Posgrado Pertinente. Here, the productive sector declare specific research needs that are worked out by students and professors, working toward the students degrees. The organization that declares the need is included in the Tutorial Committee that advise the student on his/her research trajectory. When there is a product coming out of the research, a commercial relationship is established between the research center and the company to transfer the technology
