= TOP3B =

Protein-coding gene in the species Homo sapiens

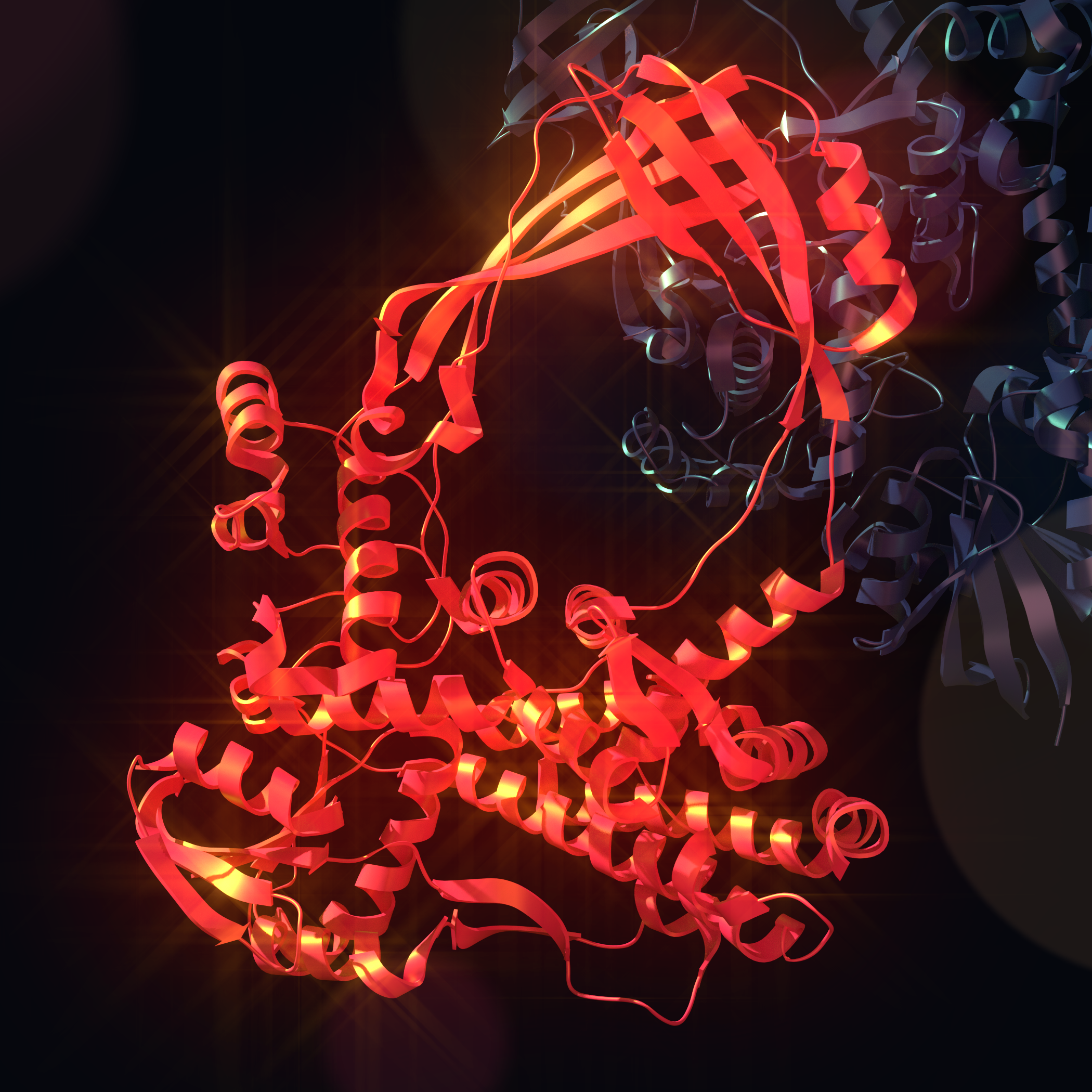

Identifiers
- Aliases: TOP3B, TOP3B1, topoisomerase (DNA) III beta, DNA topoisomerase III beta
- External IDs: OMIM: 603582; MGI: 1333803; GeneCards: TOP3B
Enzyme activity
EC #	BRENDA	ExPASy	KEGG	MetaCyc
5.6.2.1	↗	↗	↗	↗

Gene location (Human)
Chr.	Chromosome 22 (human)
Band	22q11.22	Start	21,957,025 bp
Band	22q11.22	End	21,982,813 bp

Gene location (Mouse)
Chr.	Chromosome 16 (mouse)
Band	16|16 A3	Start	16,688,600 bp
Band	16|16 A3	End	16,710,854 bp
RNA expression pattern
Bgee	Human / Mouse (ortholog); Top expressed in: paraflocculus of cerebellum; middle frontal gyrus; frontal pole; granulocyte; right ovary; stromal cell of endometrium; left ovary; Brodmann area 10; body of uterus; canal of the cervix / Top expressed in: Epithelium of choroid plexus; granulocyte; spermatocyte; choroid plexus of fourth ventricle; neural layer of retina; internal carotid artery; right kidney; superior frontal gyrus; external carotid artery; lip; More reference expression data
BioGPS	n/a
Gene ontology
Molecular function	DNA binding; DNA topoisomerase type I (single strand cut, ATP-independent) activity; protein binding; isomerase activity; RNA binding; DNA topoisomerase activity
Cellular component	condensed chromosome; nucleus
Biological process	chromosome segregation; DNA topological change
Sources:Amigo / QuickGO
Orthologs
Databases	NCBI: entry; OMA: entry
Species	Human	Mouse
Entrez	8940	21976
Ensembl	ENSG00000100038	ENSMUSG00000022779
UniProt	O95985	Q9Z321
RefSeq (mRNA)	NM_001282112; NM_001282113; NM_003935; NM_001349845; NM_001349847 NM_001349848; NM_001349850; NM_001349851; NM_001349852	NM_011624; NM_001326576
RefSeq (protein)	NP_001269041; NP_001269042; NP_003926; NP_001336774; NP_001336776 NP_001336777; NP_001336779; NP_001336780; NP_001336781	NP_001313505; NP_035754
Location (UCSC)	Chr 22: 21.96 – 21.98 Mb	Chr 16: 16.69 – 16.71 Mb
PubMed search
- Wikidata
View/Edit Human	View/Edit Mouse

DNA topoisomerase 3-beta-1 is an enzyme that in humans is encoded by the TOP3B gene.

This gene encodes a DNA topoisomerase, an enzyme that controls and alters the topologic states of DNA during transcription. This enzyme catalyzes the transient breaking and rejoining of a single strand of DNA which allows the strands to pass through one another, thus relaxing the supercoils and altering the topology of DNA. The enzyme interacts with DNA helicase SGS1 and plays a role in DNA recombination, cellular aging and maintenance of genome stability. Alternative splicing of the C-terminus of this gene results in three transcript variants which have distinct tissue specificity; however, not all variants have been fully described.
