= Thomas Sanchez (writer) =

American novelist

Thomas Sanchez (born February 26, 1944) is an American novelist.

== Life ==
Thomas Brown Sanchez was born at Oak Knoll Naval Hospital in Oakland, California, three months after his father was killed in the Pacific during World War II.

His first novel, Rabbit Boss, was named one of the 100 Greatest Western novels by the San Francisco Chronicle. Sanchez is published by Knopf/Vintage at Random House.

== Works ==
=== Novels ===
- Rabbit Boss (1973)
- Zoot-Suit Murders (1978)
- Mile Zero (1989)
- Day of the Bees (2000)
- King Bongo (2003)
- American Tropic (2013)

== Honors ==
He was the recipient of a 1980 Guggenheim Fellowship and the Chevalier des Arts et des Lettres from the French Republic.
