= Erika Hoff =

Developmental psychologist (born 1951)

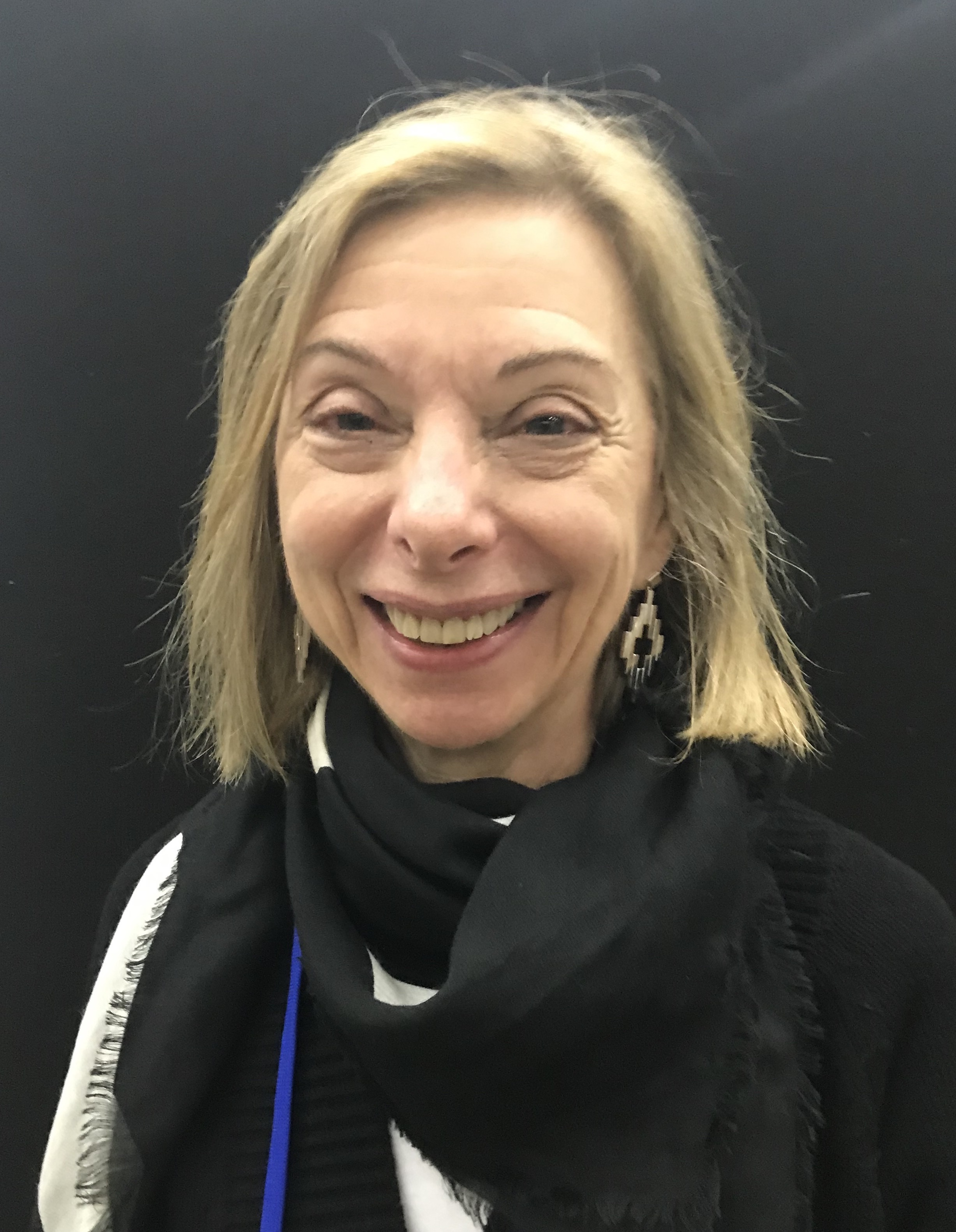
- Citizenship: American
- Occupation: Professor of Psychology

Academic background
- Education: University of Michigan
- Thesis: The Role of Linguistic Experience in the Child's Acquisition of Syntax (1981)
- Doctoral advisor: Marilyn Shatz

Academic work
- Discipline: Developmental Psychology
- Institutions: Florida Atlantic University

Erika Hoff (born 1951) is a developmental psychologist and an expert on language development and bilingualism. She is a professor of psychology at Florida Atlantic University, where she directs the Language Development Laboratory.

Hoff is the author of a popular textbook Language Development. She has co-edited several books including Research Methods in Child Language: A Practical Guide, Blackwell Handbook of Language Development, and Childhood Bilingualism: Research on Infancy Through School Age.

== Biography ==
Hoff completed a Bachelor of Science degree in education at the University of Michigan in 1972. After completing a Master of Science degree at Rutgers University, Hoff returned to the University of Michigan where she completed her PhD in Psychology in 1981 under the supervision of Marilyn Shatz. Her dissertation, which was funded by the National Science Foundation, focused on the role of linguistic input in children's language development. Prior to joining the faculty of Florida Atlantic University, Hoff was a member of the faculty at the University of Wisconsin-Parkside.

Hoff has conducted extensive research on the acquisition of language in different social contexts and on bilingualism and dual language development, funded by grants from the National Institute of Child Health and Human Development. Hoff's research has emphasized how socioeconomic disparities and other environmental factors impact children's language development. In particular, her work highlights how variation in the quality of maternal child-directed speech across families may explain individual differences in children's language development trajectories.

Hoff has conducted extensive longitudinal research on monolingual and bilingual children's language development in South Florida, underscoring how variation in the amount of exposure to each language impacts rates of language development. She has shown that in the early stages of language development, the English skills of children learning Spanish and English at the same time lag behind the English skills of monolingual children. However, when bilingual children's skills in both of their languages are considered, they know as much or more than monolingual children. Growing up in a bilingual homes does not guarantee children's success in acquiring Spanish. One relevant factor is language use. Children who only hear but do not speak Spanish are less likely to end up as Spanish speakers.

== Representative publications ==
- Hoff, E (2003). "The specificity of environmental influence: Socioeconomic status affects early vocabulary development via maternal speech". Child Development. 74 (5): 1368–1378. doi:10.1111/1467-8624.00612. PMID 14552403.
- Hoff, E (2006). "How social contexts support and shape language development". Developmental Review. 26 (1): 55–88. doi:10.1016/j.dr.2005.11.002. S2CID 36696821.
- Hoff, E (2013). "Interpreting the early language trajectories of children from low-SES and language minority homes: implications for closing achievement gaps". Developmental Psychology. 49 (1): 4–14. doi:10.1037/a0027238. PMC 4061698. PMID 22329382.
- Hoff-Ginsberg, E (1991). "Mother‐child conversation in different social classes and communicative settings". Child Development. 62 (4): 782–796. doi:10.2307/1131177. JSTOR 1131177. PMID 1935343.
- Hoff, E.; Core, C.; Place, S.; Rumiche, R.; Señor, M.; Parra, M. (2012). "Dual language exposure and early bilingual development". Journal of Child Language. 39 (1): 1–27. doi:10.1017/s0305000910000759. PMC 4323282. PMID 21418730.
- Hoff, Erika; Laursen, Brett (2019-03-08). "Socioeconomic Status and Parenting". Handbook of Parenting. Routledge. pp. 421–447. doi:10.4324/9780429401459-13. ISBN 978-0-429-40145-9. S2CID 149594037.
