= William Hailey Willis =

William Hailey Willis (April 29, 1916, Meridian, Mississippi – July 13, 2000, Durham, North Carolina) was an American classicist and a leading twentieth century papyrologist.

== Early life ==
Willis was the son of William W. Willis and Clara B. (Hailey) Willis. He married Rachel E. (Hamilton) Willis on December 20, 1943, in Meridian, MS.

== Scholarly career ==
Willis was educated at Mississippi College (B.A.), Columbia University (M.A.), and Yale University (Ph.D.). Willis was a professor of Classics at the University of Mississippi from 1946 until 1963, when he relocated to Duke University. Willis' decision to change institutions in 1963 was related, in part, to the strife that surrounded racial integration at the University of Mississippi, a cause that he had both supported and advanced. In 1973 Willis served as president of the American Philological Association. He was awarded a Guggenheim fellowship in 1980.

Willis' scholarly career included extensive work on papyrology and he published numerous papers dealing with ancient papyri.

He was instrumental in building the papyrus collection now housed at the David M. Rubenstein Rare Book & Manuscript Library at Duke University and in advancing the efforts of the papyrus research center, then called the Duke Databank of Documentary Papyri, He was credited with producing an electronic edition of the Duke Data Bank of Documentary Papyri that was disseminated on CD-ROM by the Packard Humanities Institute. At Duke Willis also served as editor of the journal Greek, Roman, and Byzantine Studies.

== Scholarship ==
- (with Klaus Maresch) 1988. “The Encounter of Alexander with the Brahmans: New Fragments of the Cynic Diatribe P.Genev.inv. 271,” ZPE 74:59–83.
- 1988. “Oxyrhynchite Documents among the Robinson Papyri,” BASP 25:99–127.
- 1990. “A New Fragment of the Bodmer Aspis,” Recherches et rencontres 2:167–171.
- 1990. “The Letter of Peter (1 Peter): Coptic text, translation, notes and variant readings,” in J. E. Goehring et al., The Crosby-Schøyen Codex (= CSCO 521, Subsidia 85 [Louvain 1990]) 135–215.
- 1990. “The Robinson-Cologne Papyrus of Achilles Tatius,” GRBS 31:73–102.
- 1991. “Comoedia Dukiana,” GRBS 32:331–353.
- (with Klaus Maresch) 1997. The Archive of Ammon Scholasticus of Panopolis: The Legacy of Harpocration(=Pap.Colon. 26.1 [Opladen 1997].

== Necrology ==
- Notice published in Greek, Roman, and Byzantine Studies
