= Zoot-Suit Murders =

1978 book by Thomas Sanchez

- First edition
- Author: Thomas Sanchez
- Language: English
- Genre: Historical, mystery
- Publisher: E. P. Dutton
- Publication date: October 1978
- Publication place: United States
- Media type: Print (hardback & paperback)
- Pages: 230 pp (first edition, hardback)
- ISBN: 0-525-24060-8 (first edition, hardback)
- OCLC: 4114381
- Dewey Decimal: 813/.5/4
- LC Class: PZ4.S1928 Zo PS3569.A469

Zoot-Suit Murders, by Thomas Sanchez, is a 1978 murder mystery set in the Los Angeles of the 1940s and employing the true historical events of the Zoot Suit Riots as a backdrop.
