= Phyllis Chinlund =

American former filmmaker and social worker

- Born: May 2, 1939 (age 87); New York City, U.S.
- Education: Smith College; Stanford University; Silberman School of Social Work
- Occupations: Filmmaker; memoirist
- Spouse: Ray Witlin (m. 1970; died 2002)
- Awards: Guggenheim Fellowship (1980)

Phyllis Chinlund (born May 2, 1939) is an American former filmmaker, retired social worker, and memoirist. She worked on over twenty documentaries as a director and filmmaker and was a 1980 Guggenheim Fellow. She later worked as a geriatric social worker after moving to Maine, and wrote a memoir named Looking Back from the Gate (2016).

== Biography ==
Phyllis Chinlund was born on May 2, 1939, in New York City, and lived in Pittsburgh as a young child. She obtained her BA from Smith College in 1961.

In 1965, Chinlund got a master's degree in documentary film from Stanford University, returned to New York City, and started her filmmaking career, eventually having at least twenty directing and editing credits to her name as a documentary filmmaker. She won a CINE Golden Eagle for her film Robin, Peter and Darryl: Three to the Hospital (1968), a Christopher Columbus International Film Festival award for Two Worlds to Remember (1970), and an International Film & TV Festival of New York Silver Medal for It Began with Birds (1974). Her film Good Girl aired on the WNET series Adolescent Rites on October 14, 1979. She also did two 1980 episodes of Old Friends ... New Friends, specifically the ones featuring Willie Stargell and Orville Harrison.

In 1980, Chinlund was awarded a Guggenheim Fellowship in filmmaking. She was editor for Suzanne Bauman's documentary film The Women of Summer. In 1987, she appeared on the PBS documentary The Television Makers.

Chinlund obtained her master's degree in social work from the Silberman School of Social Work in 1989, and she began a career as a social worker, with her specialty being geriatric mental health. In 2013, she retired from social work. In April 2016, she released a memoir, Looking Back from the Gate: A Story of Love, Art, and Dementia, inspired from a journal she wrote during her struggle with her husband's Alzheimer's disease.

Chinlund married photographer and filmmaker Ray Witlin in 1970, after both divorced their previous respective spouses. They remained married until he died in 2002. As of 2016, she lived in Cumberland Foreside, Maine, having moved to the state from Manhattan in 1998 due to rising housing costs in New York City.

== Filmography ==
- Robin, Peter and Darryl: Three to the Hospital (1968).
- Two Worlds to Remember (1970)
- It Began with Birds (1974)
- Good Girl (1979)
- Old Friends, New Friends (1980; as director and producer for two episodes)
- Pablo Picasso: The Legacy of a Genius (1982, as editor and producer)
- The Women of Summer (1985, as editor)
