= Paul Meyvaert =

Paul Meyvaert was a Benedictine monk who turned to medieval scholarship, and became a renowned scholar whose philological and historical work focused on medieval conceptions of authorship. Largely self-taught, he published on forgeries, iconography, and textual criticism. He taught at Duke University and in 1971 was appointed at Harvard University, where he spent the rest of his life. He was executive director of the Medieval Academy of America, and editor of Speculum, its journal.

Meyvaert was born Jeffrey Meyvaert in the United Kingdom on November 12, 1921; his mother was British, his father, whom he barely knew, was Belgian. His mother was very religious; she raised him in England, Belgium, and Ireland, with an eye on his entering a religious vocation. When he entered the Order of Saint Benedict he adopted "Paul" as his first name. He lived mostly on the Isle of Wight in Quarr Abbey, and taught himself the skills necessary to become a scholar of medieval history. He published his first scholarly in 1955, and from then on published a series of articles that investigated first the history of the Benedictines, and then, more broadly, other topics in medieval history, with a keen interest in the history of religion and textual issues. He wrote two monographs, on Bede and Gregory the Great, made an important textual discovery pertaining to the mission of Saints Cyril and Methodius, and published a study of the textual tradition of the Benedictine rule.
