= John R. Maynard =

American literary scholar

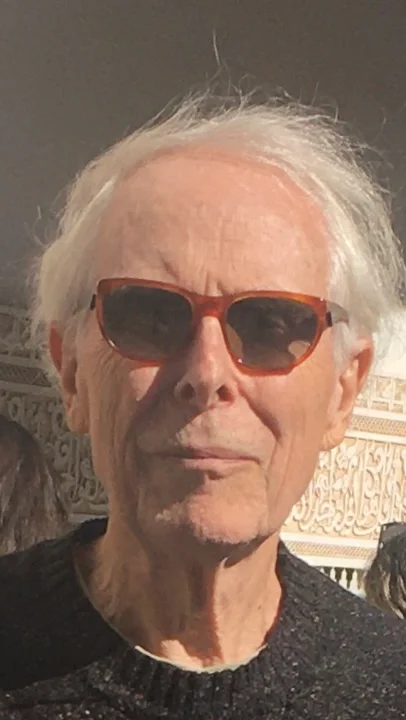
- Born: 1941 (age 84–85); Williamsville, New York. U.S
- Occupations: Literary scholar, author and academic
- Title: Professor of English Emeritus
- Awards: Guggenheim Fellowship

Academic background
- Education: Harvard University

Academic work
- Institutions: New York University

John R. Maynard is an American literary scholar whose work focuses on Victorian literature, literary theory, and the relationship between literature, culture, and sexuality. More recently, he has focused on writing and publishing poetry, including one volume published and two accepted for publication next year.

He is professor emeritus of English at New York University (NYU), where he taught from 1974 until his retirement in 2017.

== Biography ==
Maynard was born in 1941 in Williamsville, New York. He earned his Bachelor of Arts in History and Literature, graduating summa cum laude, from Harvard University in 1963. He remained at Harvard for his graduate studies, receiving a Ph.D. in English in 1970.

== Career ==
After completing his doctorate, Maynard taught at Harvard as an assistant professor until 1974. That year, he joined the English Department at NYU, progressing from assistant to associate, and ultimately full professor by 1984. He chaired the department from 1983 to 1989 and later served as the chair of the university's Faculty Senators Council.

Over his career, Maynard directed approximately 45 doctoral dissertations, authored 80 articles and reviews, and served on ten Search, Promotion, and Tenure Committees. He also held the role of Director of Undergraduate Studies for three years.

During his tenure as department chair at NYU, he led several curricular innovations. His leadership helped the department pioneer courses in literary theory and diversify beyond the traditional English and American canon. Maynard also spearheaded fundraising efforts that raised over $2 million, which supported graduate fellowships, prizes, and the English Department's Biography Seminar.

Maynard retired at the end of the Fall 2017 semester after 52 years of teaching eight years at Harvard and 44 at NYU. He was granted professor emeritus status in 2018.

== Scholarly works ==
Much of Maynard's scholarship explores the ways literary texts reflect and shape cultural understandings, particularly in 19th-century Britain. His published works include studies on poets such as Poet Robert Browning and Novelist Charlotte Brontë, and examinations of Victorian discourses on religion and sexuality.

For over two decades, Maynard co-edited Victorian Literature and Culture, a scholarly journal that became a venue for emerging work in the field, including eco-criticism and Disability studies.

As a poet, Maynard has produced six volumes of poetry of which one, Armando and Maisie, has appeared and two, What's It Like To Be Old and Being in Time and Change, have been accepted for publication in 2026.

== Awards and recognition ==
Maynard has received numerous fellowships and awards, including a Guggenheim Fellowship, a National Endowment for the Humanities grant, and the Thomas J. Wilson Prize.

Maynard has also been recognized with the Albert Nelson Marquis Lifetime Achievement Award by Marquis Who’s Who, and holds memberships in prestigious academic organizations, including the Modern Language Association and PEN.

== Selected publications ==
- Maynard, John R. (July 1, 2025). Armando and Maisie. Kelsay Books. p. 64. ISBN 978-1639807901.
- Maynard, John (1977). Browning's Youth. Cambridge, Mass.: Harvard Univ. Pr. ISBN 978-0-674-08441-4.
- Maynard, John (2009). Literary intention, literary interpretation, and readers. Peterborough: Broadview press. ISBN 978-1-55111-897-0.
- Browning, Robert; Collins, Thomas J.; Altick, Richard D. (2001). The ring and the book. Broadview literary texts. Peterborough, Ont. ; Orchard Park, NY: Broadview Press. ISBN 978-1-55111-372-2. OCLC 45486611.
- Maynard, John (2009). Charlotte Brontë and sexuality (Digital print. [der Ausg.] 1987 ed.). Cambridge: Cambridge Univ. Press. ISBN 978-0-521-33587-4.
- Maynard, John (1993). Victorian discourses on sexuality and religion. Cambridge, [England] ; New York, NY, USA: Cambridge University Press. ISBN 978-0-521-33254-5.
