= CICATA =

The Research Center for Applied Science and Advanced Technology (CICATA) was created by an agreement of the Instituto Politécnico Nacional (IPN) Consultive General Council (CGC) agreement, 1 September 1996. At the beginning, it was a research center with five different units. These units were located at:

- Altamira, Tamaulipas
- Ciudad de México
- Morelia, Michoacán
- Querétaro
- Puebla

As time passed by CICATA Puebla moved to Tlaxcala, and became the Research Center for Applied Biotechnology (CIBA). On the other hand, CICATA Morelia was closed by instructions of Miguel Angel Correa Jasso, General Director of IPN, in 2000. The remaining units, Altamira and Querétaro, became independent research centers in 2005. Currently, these research centers are known as:

- CICATA Altamira
- CICATA Legaria
- CICATA Querétaro

The CICATA's objective is to serve as a liaison between the academic community and the productive sector. To that end, CICATA provides educational, research, and technology development services.
