= Barbara Wilk (artist) =

American artist and animator (1923–2007)

- Born: March 27, 1923; New York City, U.S.
- Died: April 2, 2007 (aged 84); Connecticut, U.S.
- Education: Smith College (BA); University of Bridgeport (MS)
- Occupations: Artist; filmmaker
- Spouse: Max Wilk
- Children: 3
- Awards: Guggenheim Fellowship (1980)

Barbara Wilk (March 27, 1923 – April 2, 2007) was an American artist and filmmaker. Originally working as an oil painter, as well as an instructor at Connecticut colleges, she shifted to printmaking in her later life. She also worked as an animator and won a 1980 Guggenheim Fellowship for one of her animated films.

== Life and career ==
Barbara Wilk was born on March 27, 1923, in Manhattan. She was a fan of Western stars during her youth and later considered herself a "New York cowgirl". She began her art education when she was thirteen. She obtained a BA from Smith College in 1944, and was later educated at the Art Students League of New York and the Fernand Léger Atelier. Outside of art, she was editor and writer for the United Press International Radio Network from 1944 to 1948. As she recalled in Pasatiempo, in 1947 she met Pablo Picasso, who then made a drawing for her which was later lost when it flew out of her car on the way out.

Following her education, she worked as a freelance artist, teacher and writer. From 1968 to 1971, she worked as owner-dealer at the Optimums Art Gallery in Westport, Connecticut. She worked as an art instructor at Housatonic Community College in 1970. She later returned to education, studying at the Camden Institute in London (1971–1973) before obtaining an MS from the University of Bridgeport (UBPT) in 1975. In addition to returning to HCC as an art instructor from 1976 to 1977 and attending classes at the Brookfield Craft Center the latter year, she worked as an art instructor at Fairfield University (1975 and 1977) and as a synectics instructor at UBPT (1979–1980).

In 1975, she released "He/She", an animated film "based on sacred Tantric diagrams of the art and practice of love and the tale of creation"; it was shown at the Second International Festival of Women's Films in 1976 and won awards at the 1977 New Jersey Film Festival and 1978 Connecticut Film Festival. In 1980, she was awarded a Guggenheim Fellowship in filmmaking; she used it for an animated film on Diné Bahaneʼ for which she hand-painted two thousand cel frames. Although she originally worked primarily in oil painting, she also did sculpting, ceramics, and weaving. In the 1990s, she became involved in printmaking, particularly monoprints. An exhibition on her prints inspired by lobby cards for Western movies was held at the Jean Cocteau Cinema in June 2000.

She had three children with her husband Max Wilk, to whom she was married until her death. They lived in a waterfront home in Saugatuck, Connecticut, where they collected art in their leisure. She also lived at a second home in Santa Fe since the 1980s. Her activism involved promoting the arts, serving as president of the Westport-Weston Arts Council from 1979 to 1980, as well as a collaboration with Save the Children to supply the Navajo Nation with eyeglasses and ophthalmologists. During her last years, Wilk struggled with cancer but was still making art as late as 2006. She died on April 2, 2007, in Connecticut. In 2011, some of her own paintings and prints were sold at an auction after her husband's death.
