= Doug and Mary Lou Nemanic =

Doug and Mary Lou Nemanic are an American husband-and-wife team of documentary photographers, journalists and filmmakers who by 2020 have been working together for more than 40 years utilizing mass media methods to record and preserve everyday life. Together they form the independent production company Documentary America.

== Background ==
Doug is a Guggenheim fellow. in filmmaking has worked in television news and documentary and whose award-winning films have been seen on CBS, NBC, ABC, and PBS. Mary Lou has a Ph.D. in American Studies, is an Associate Professor Emerita at Penn State University, and is the author of One Day For Democracy: Independence Day and the Americanization of Iron Range Immigrants, (2007, Ohio University Press). She co-edited her second book, Cultural Production in Virtual and Imagined Worlds (Cambridge Scholars Publishing 2010), with University of Toronto colleague, Tracey Bowen. Her third book, Metro Dailies in the Age of Multimedia Journalism (2020, Temple University Press) was published in 2020 (http://tupress.temple.edu/search?utf8=%E2%9C%93&q=metro+dailies&commit=Search). Doug and Mary Lou have been documenting everyday life since the mid-1970s. They have produced two feature-length documentary films. Cattleman’s Days: The Granddaddy of Colorado Rodeos (2006) and The Iron Range Family Album (2012)

== History ==
Douglas F. Nemanic worked in media as a reporter, photographer, filmmaker and writer for approximately 17 years. Nemanic made approximately 12,000 television news films, winning international, national, and regional awards. Nemanic then applied his experience to independently documenting the regional subculture of northeastern Minnesota known as the Iron Range. In the fall of 1977, Nemanic left WCCO-TV in Minneapolis, a position he had held for nine years, and started the Tamarack Iron Range Documentary Project.

Nemanic was introduced to Mary Lou Gust via a connection at WCCO-TV, who felt her background in large-scale documentary would be beneficial to the project. Gust, an instructor at the University of Minnesota-Minneapolis, had worked professionally in both still photography and film, had experience in darkroom processing, long-term photo preservation, and nonprofit fundraising. In addition to her field experience, she was currently teaching classes in visual communication and photojournalism. Gust had earned a Baccalaureate degree (B.A.) in journalism, was a summa cum laude graduate, a Phi Beta Kappa, and had recently received a master's degree in mass communications, with master's theses in documentary and photojournalism. Gust joined the Tamarack Iron Range project as the director of photography and the head of fundraising.

Together, Nemanic and Gust founded the independent production company Documentary America. In the spring of 1978 the Tamarack Iron Range project held its first major shoot, documenting the area around Nemanic's hometown of Aurora on the eastern end of the Mesabi Range. Student volunteers from Gust's photojournalism course at the University of Minnesota were also included. Under the combined direction of Nemanic and Gust, the shoot produced more than five thousand still photographs. On the 4th of July they held an exhibit on the Iron Range, which was attended by locals, guests and public officials including the Governor of Minnesota, and various other dignitaries.

In 1980 Nemanic and Gust's work on the Iron Range was nationally recognized when Nemanic was awarded a Guggenheim Fellowship in filmmaking, an award that would bring further support for the project. Gust's contribution would also be recognized when the two received a legislative commendation from the Minnesota House of Representatives, a recognition that brought The Tamarack Iron Range project to the attention of the news media.

Over the next ten years, Nemanic and Gust made regular trips to the Iron Range to continue documenting the culture through photography and by the recording of oral histories. While developing the Tamarack system of documenting and preserving everyday life for posterity, they expanded the project into other areas including ice hockey, which was a strong part of Iron Range history, as well as unrelated subjects such as local politics.

During the mid-1980s, Gust returned to graduate school at the University of Minnesota. Gust incorporated the Tamarack System of Documentary into her graduate courses. In order to encourage and support photographic preservation, Nemanic and Gust released an information sheet outlining the project's system of photo preservation to the public, the media, and to various historical organizations. The Tamarack System was adopted by families as well as by other documentarians for their independent projects. Historical organizations duplicated the preservation sheet and released its contents. In 1987 the Tamarack Iron Range Project ended after ten years; Nemanic and Gust married in 1988.

During her doctoral studies, Mary Lou continued to return to the Iron Range for additional research, searching for lost documents, recording oral histories and photographing people and events. Her doctoral thesis was about the unique history of the 4th of July on Iron Range, One Day For Democracy: Independence Day and the Americanization of Iron Range Immigrants was published as a book by Ohio University Press in 2007. This additional research and photographic documentation then became a part of the greater Iron Range collection. Mary Lou graduated from the University of Minnesota in Minneapolis in 1996 with a Ph.D. in American Studies.

== Cattleman's Days ==
In 1998, Doug and Mary Lou left Minnesota and lived for the next three years in the Rocky Mountains of southwest Colorado, where they taught the Tamarack System of Documentary to students at Western State College in Gunnison.

While living in the Rocky Mountains, they used the Tamarack System to document everyday life in the Gunnison Valley, often utilizing help from student documentarians. Their main project was built around the 100th anniversary of Cattlemen's Days Rodeo and Races

A crew of 13 was hired to record the 100th anniversary using still photography, video and sound recordings. In 2000 the Nemanics published a not-for-profit commemorative photo book on the history of Cattlemen's Days and produced a half-hour radio documentary.

Cattleman’s Days: The Grandaddy of Colorado Rodeos was completed in 2006 and distributed under the Documentary America name. This documentary tells the story of that grand and glorious time during which a community gathered together to celebrate their heritage. Six and a half years were devoted to completing the film. It won Best Feature Length Documentary at the Iris Film Festival in 2009

== Life in the East ==
In 2001, Mary Lou was hired to design and implement a convergent media communications program at Penn State Altoona. Living in the East provided Doug and Mary Lou with the opportunity to expand Documentary America's documentation work into central Pennsylvania, as well as into major eastern cities such as Boston, New York, Pittsburgh, Philadelphia, Cleveland, and Washington D. C. Their first major shoot was the documentation of the 4th of July celebration in Philadelphia in 2002. It was the first Independence Day following the terrorist attacks of New York City nine months before, and they were able to record the dauntless spirit of America during those troubled times.

== The Iron Range Family Album ==
In 2011, Documentary America completed work on The Iron Range Family Album, a magazine-format documentary, utilizing 1,100 still photographs from the Iron Range collection. Over the past 35 years, the collection had grown to approximately 40,000 photographs. The film segments are edited to the work of Iron Range musicians, some of whom volunteered for the project.

The Iron Range Family Album premiered at the Northern Lights International Music Festival for gifted students in Aurora Minnesota on July 2, 2011. The Iron Rage Family Album was later shown at the Iris Film Festival of Huntingdon Pennsylvania, as a special guest exhibition. In March 2013 The Iron Range Family Album was accepted on behalf of the state of Minnesota and introduced into the Governor's Library as a work of historical significance to regional culture. As of 2015 The Iron Range Family Album has been shown in various scholarly forums across the country, including the conference of the Mid-Atlantic Popular & American Culture Association (MAPACA), and as a nationally sponsored event at the Popular Culture/American Culture Association annual conference in Boston 2012. It has aired on cable television in Minnesota and Pennsylvania

== The Lightning Gazette: The Magazine of Everyday Life ==
In May 2012, Documentary America began work on The Lightning Gazette, a new online magazine about everyday life. Doug took on the role of editor and publisher, Mary Lou that of technical editor and contributing editor. Anthony Bookhammer, who had joined Documentary America as production assistant, transitioned into the role of Art Director. In the Lightning Gazette, Documentary America is able to present the works of others, and draw from their collections of approximately 300,000 still photographs, historical documents and artifacts.

Since its inception The Lightning Gazette has attracted readership from various states and provinces, and has included work from respected experts within the fields of art, music, journalism, history, media, and education. The Lightning Gazette can be viewed free of charge online at https://thelightninggazette.com/.

== Volunteers ==
Hundreds of people have volunteered thousands of hours to help make and display the Documentary America record of everyday life. During the 1980s and 1990s, researchers volunteered time to help Documentary America with difficult topics.

== The Ice Hockey Project ==
Documentary America's Tamarack Hockey Project was founded in 1980 and over the next nine seasons recorded examples of every level being played in Minnesota. In addition to still photographs, 16 mm film and videotape were also shot, and natural sound and oral history recordings were made. The hockey collection was recorded on a nonprofit/not-for-profit basis to help preserve the history of the sport. It will one day be donated to the United States Hockey Hall of Fame for preservation.

In May 2013, twenty 16x20 framed silver prints of hockey great John Mariucci were donated to the U.S. Hockey Hall of Fame. The photographs are being exhibited at the Hall in Eveleth, Minnesota, on a rotating basis with the rest of their permanent collection.

== Return To Minnesota ==
In May 2019 Documentary America returned to its original base in the Twin Cities in order to concentrate on their Minnesota collections.
