= Marilyn Shatz =

American academic

- Occupation: Academic

Academic background
- Education: University of Pennsylvania

Academic work
- Institutions: University of Michigan

Marilyn Shatz is an American scholar known for her work in language development and discourse. She holds the title of Professor Emerita of Psychology and Linguistics at the University of Michigan, where she worked from 1977 until retiring in 2009.

Shatz investigated child development from a holistic perspective including cognition, social and linguistic influences. She was a pioneer in the study of motherese, which is a type of prosodic-adapted speech used by adults when speaking to an infant. In her work, she defended the interplay of nature and nurture in language development.

== Biography ==
Marilyn Shatz completed her studies in the field of Psychology in the University of Pennsylvania. She received a B. A in 1971, a M.A in 1973, and a Ph.D. in 1975 under the supervision of Rochel Gelman. Her Ph.D. dissertation was entitled "On Understanding Messages: A Study in the Comprehension of Indirect Directives by Young Children". On October, 1st, 1976, Shatz participated of the First Annual Boston University Conference on Language Development, where discussed the role of maternal gestures in first language acquisition.

Shatz joined the Department of Psychology of the University of Michigan in 1977 as an assistant professor and she was continuously promoted to associate professor in 1979 and professor in 1984. Shatz also directed the Program of Linguistics from 1995 until 2000 when this Program recovered its Department status. Shatz was then named the first chair of the Department of Linguistics. During her career, she both published edited several articles and books. After retiring in 2009, Shatz moved to North Carolina and took a position as adjunct professor in the University of North Carolina Wilmington, where she collaborated with students in the field of language development.

== Research ==
Shatz's research points to the interaction between nature and nurture in the process of language acquisition. Her empirical studies employed experimental methodologies and cross-linguistic investigation to explore ideas such as the impact of social interaction on the development of children's communicative skills, as well as the effect of language on the understanding of mind. Her most cited publication discuss children's development in the use of verbs such as think and know to indicate mental states.

Shatz's observations of her grandson Ricky between the ages of one and three years old led to the publication of her book A toddler's life: Becoming a person. In this book, Shatz reflected on the development of cognitive, linguistic, and social abilities during childhood and discussed how an individual's social environment can influence one's development.

Shatz and her former doctoral advisee Erika Hoff edited and published the Blackwell handbook of language development in 2007. In this work, Shatz and Hoff include a broad discussion of language development across time for both typical and atypical learners and considering monolingual and bilingual contexts.

Language acquisition in the context of bilingual education is vastly discussed in Shatz's book The education of English language learners: Research to practice. In this volume, research-based evidence is presented to guide both educational practice and policy. The editors' organization of this volume implicitly argue for the richness and complexity of cognitive development in members of multilingual communities.

== Awards ==
- 1980, J. S. Guggenheim Fellowship
- 1980, National Science Foundation
- 1985, Fulbright Award

== Selected publications ==
=== Books ===
- Hoff, E. & Shatz, M. (Eds). (2007). Blackwell handbook of language development. Wiley-Blackwell.
- Shatz, M. (1994). A toddler's life: Becoming a person. Oxford University Press.
- Shatz, M., & Wilkinson, L. C. (Eds.). (2010). The education of English language learners: Research to practice. Guilford Press.
- Shatz, M., & Wilkinson, L. C. (2013). Understanding language in diverse classrooms: A primer for all teachers. Routledge.

=== Articles ===
- Shatz, M. (1978). On the development of communicative understandings: An early strategy for interpreting and responding to messages. Cognitive Psychology, 10(3), 271–301. https://doi.org/10.1016/0010-0285(78)90001-4
- Shatz, M., Diesendruck, G., Martinez-Beck, I., & Akar, D. (2003). The influence of language and socioeconomic status on children's understanding of false belief. Developmental Psychology, 39(4), 717–729. https://doi.org/10.1037/0012-1649.39.4.717
- Shatz, M. & Gelman, R. (1973). The development of communication skills: Modifications in the speech of young children as a function of listener. Monographs of the Society for Research in Child Development, 38(5), 1–38. https://doi.org/10.2307/1165783
- Shatz, M., Tare, M., Nguyen, S. P., & Young, T. (2010). Acquiring non-object terms: The case for time words. Journal of Cognition and Development, 11(1), 16–36. https://doi.org/10.1080/15248370903453568
- Shatz, M., Wellman, H. M., & Silber, S. (1983). The acquisition of mental verbs: A systematic investigation of the first reference to mental state. Cognition, 14(3), 301–321. https://doi.org/10.1016/0010-0277(83)90008-2
