= James Champoux =

American microbiologist

James J. Champoux (died 13 May 2019) was an American microbiologist who worked at University of Washington and an Elected Fellow of the American Association for the Advancement of Science.

== Education ==
He earned his B.S. at University of Washington and his Ph.D. at Stanford University.

== Research ==
His interests were retroviruses and topoisomerases and his highest cited paper is DNA Topoisomerases: Structure, Function, and Mechanism at 2260 times, according to Google Scholar.

== Publications ==
- Effects of DNA and protein size on substrate cleavage by human tyrosyl-DNA phosphodiesterase 1. Interthal H, Champoux JJ The Biochemical Journal. 2011 Jun; 436 3: 559-66
- Multiple nucleotide preferences determine cleavage-site recognition by the HIV-1 and M-MuLV RNases H. Schultz SJ, Zhang M, Champoux JJ Journal of Molecular Biology. 2010 Mar; 397 1: 161-78
- Preferred sequences within a defined cleavage window specify DNA 3' end-directed cleavages by retroviral RNases H. Schultz SJ, Zhang M, Champoux JJ The Journal of Biological Chemistry. 2009 Nov; 284 47: 32225-38
- Assays for the preferential binding of human topoisomerase I to supercoiled DNA. Yang Z, Champoux JJ Methods in Molecular Biology. 2009; 582 : 49-57
- Mutational analysis of the preferential binding of human topoisomerase I to supercoiled DNA. Yang Z, Carey JF, Champoux JJ The FEBS journal. 2009 Oct; 276 20: 5906-19
