= CINVESTAV =

Mexican scientific research institution

Center for Research and Advanced Studies of the National Polytechnic Institute
- Centro de Investigación y de Estudios Avanzados del Instituto Politécnico Nacional
- Official Seal
- Other names: CINVESTAV-IPN
- Type: Public
- Established: 17 April 1961
- Founders: Adolfo López Mateos, Jaime Torres Bodet, Antonio Ortiz Mena and Arturo Rosenblueth
- Affiliations: ANUIES, CUDI, UDUAL, National Polytechnic Institute
- Director: Alberto Sánchez Hernández
- Postgraduates: 2,128
- Location: Mexico City, Mexico; 19°30′33″N 99°07′46″W
- Campus: 10 across Mexico, mostly urban
- Colors: Green and white
- Website: www.cinvestav.mx

The Center for Research and Advanced Studies of the National Polytechnic Institute (in Spanish: Centro de Investigación y de Estudios Avanzados del Instituto Politécnico Nacional, or simply as CINVESTAV–IPN) is a Mexican non-governmental scientific research institution affiliated with the National Polytechnic Institute and founded by president Adolfo López Mateos on 17 April 1961, initially planned as a postgraduate department of the National Polytechnic Institute; this was later modified by President José López Portillo, on 17 September 1982.

The modification by President Portillo stipulates that it is a decentralized organ of public interest, with legal personality and own patrimony. Cinvestav receives an annual subsidy by the Federal Government to fund its operations.

== Organization ==
=== Campuses ===
The institute is divided into 10 research centers; three of these are in Mexico City, while the others are dispersed across the country. They are located as follows:

- Mexico City: Zacatenco, Coapa (south) and San Borja
- Guadalajara, Jalisco
- Irapuato, Guanajuato
- Mérida, Yucatán
- Querétaro, Querétaro
- Saltillo, Coahuila
- Monterrey, Nuevo León
- Ciudad Victoria, Tamaulipas

=== Departments ===
The institute is divided into 33 departments:

Natural Sciences
Physics
Applied Physics (Mérida)
Mathematics
Chemistry

Biological sciences and health
Cell Biology
Marine resources (Mérida)
Molecular Biomedicine
Biochemistry
Pharmacobiology (South)
Pharmacology
Physiology, Biophysics and Neuroscience
Genetics and Molecular Biology
Molecular pathogenesis
Toxicology

Technology and engineering sciences
Automatic control
Biotechnology and Bioengineering
Biotechnology and Biochemistry (Irapuato)
Computing (Zacatenco)
Electrical engineering (Zacatenco)
Computing (Guadalajara)
Electronic design (Guadalajara)
Electric power systems (Guadalajara)
Automatic control (Guadalajara)
Telecommunications
Ceramic engineering (Saltillo)
Genetic engineering (Irapuato)
Metallurgical engineering (Saltillo)
Information Technology Laboratory (Tamaulipas)
Robotics and Advanced Manufacturing (Saltillo)
Materials (Querétaro)
Nanoscience and Nanotechnology Sciences

Social sciences and humanities
Human ecology (Mérida)
Educational research (South)
Mathematics education
Methodology and theory of science

== World ranking ==
In a 2019 ranking, Cinvestav was ranked fourth within research centers in Latin America and held position 118 in the world.
