= Immunoglobulin C1-set domain =

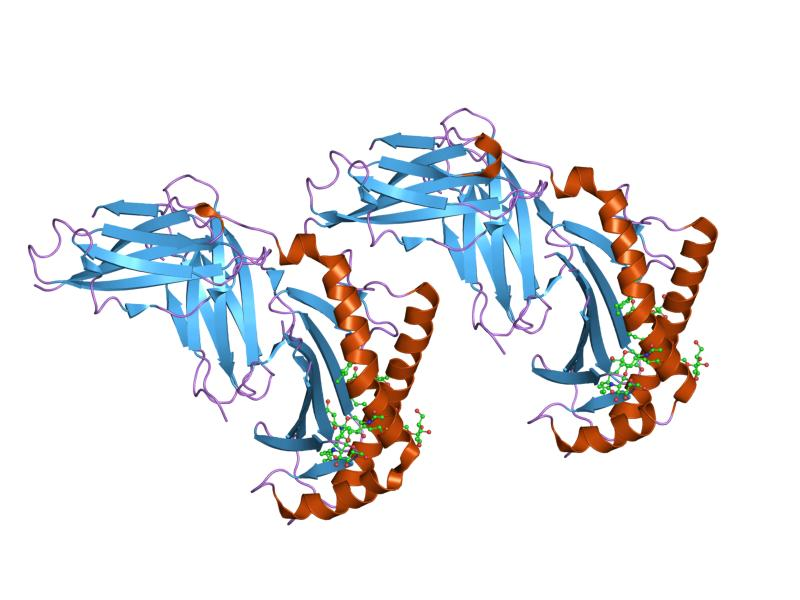
- Structure of T-cell surface glycoprotein CD1d antigen.

Identifiers
- Symbol: C1-set
- Pfam: PF07654
- InterPro: IPR003597
Available protein structures:
- PDB: IPR003597 PF07654 (ECOD; PDBsum)
- AlphaFold: IPR003597; PF07654

C1-set domains are classical Ig-like domains resembling the antibody constant domain. C1-set domains are found almost exclusively in molecules involved in the immune system, such as in immunoglobulin light and heavy chains, in the major histocompatibility complex (MHC) class I and II complex molecules, and in various T-cell receptors.

== Human proteins containing this domain ==
AZGP1; B2M; CD1A; CD1B; CD1C; CD1D; CD1E; DMA; DQB2; DRB1; ELK2P1; FCGRT; HFE; HHLA2; HLA-A; HLA-B; HLA-B35; HLA-B57; HLA-C; HLA-CW; HLA-Cw; HLA-D; HLA-DMA; HLA-DMB; HLA-DOA; HLA-DOB; HLA-DP; HLA-DPA1; HLA-DPB1; HLA-DQA1; HLA-DQA2; HLA-DQB1; HLA-DQB2; HLA-DRA; HLA-DRB1; HLA-DRB2; HLA-DRB3; HLA-DRB4; HLA-DRw12; HLA-Dw12; HLA-E; HLA-F; HLA-G; HLA-G2.2; HLA-H; HLAC; IGHA1; IGHA2; IGHD; IGHE; IGHG1; IGHG2; IGHG3; IGHG4; IGHM; IGHV4-31; IGKC; IGKV1-5; IGKV2-24; IGL@; IGLC1; IGLC3; IGLL1; IGLV2-14; IGLV3-21; IGLV3-25; IGLV4-3; MICA; MICB; MR1; SIRPA; SIRPB1; SIRPG; SNC73; TAPBP; TAPBPL; TRBC1; TRBV19; TRBV21-1; TRBV3-1; TRBV5-4; TRBV7-2; micB;
