= IGH@ =

Region on human chromosome 14

IGH

Identifiers
- Aliases: IGH, IGD1, IGH.1@, IGH@, IGHD@, IGHDY1, IGHJ, IGHJ@, IGHV, IGHV@, immunoglobulin heavy locus, IgH locus
- External IDs: OMIM: 146910, 147010, 147070; MGI: 96442; GeneCards: IGH
Orthologs
Databases	NCBI: entry
Species	Human	Mouse
Entrez	3492	111507
Ensembl	n/a	n/a
UniProt	n a	n/a
RefSeq (mRNA)	n/a	n/a
RefSeq (protein)	n/a	n/a
Location (UCSC)	n/a	n/a
PubMed search
- Wikidata
View/Edit Human	View/Edit Mouse

Immunoglobulin heavy locus, also known as IGH@, is a region on human chromosome 14 that contains many gene segments for the heavy chains of human antibodies (or immunoglobulins). The @ notation indicates its designation as a gene cluster: IGH@ is a collection of many gene segments.

Immunoglobulins recognize foreign antigens and initiate immune responses such as phagocytosis and the complement system. Each immunoglobulin molecule consists of two identical heavy chains and two identical light chains. This region represents the germline organization of the heavy chain locus. The locus includes V (variable), D (diversity), J (joining), and C (constant) segments.

== Structure ==
The heavy chain locus (IGH@) is arranged in a manner of V_{n}-D_{x}-J_{y}-C_{z}, with a number of possible Variable, Diversity, Joining, and Constant segments to "choose" from. Due to the extensive assembly needed, none of the named parts of the IGH@ locus are "protein-coding genes" in the traditional sense.

The V, D, and J segments are arranged in a manner suited for V(D)J recombination, with conserved recombination signal sequences (RSS) between them to lead to the intended joining of one each of V, D, and J into one exon. In other words, they are only partial exons surrounded by RSS.

The C segments each consists of multiple exons arranged in a manner suitable for class switch recombination, making them more "gene-like". Each C segment consists of:

- A conserved conserved nucleotide motif called a switch (S) region, found in all H chains (i.e. S_{μ}, S_{γ3}, etc.) except the IgD chain.
- A number of C (constant) exons, which encode an immunoglobulin-fold constant domain, except in a few mammalian C2 codons where it encodes a flexible "hinge" derived from the bulky domain.
- A poly-A tract.
- One or more m (membrane) exons, which encode the transmembrane region found on the B cell receptor (BCR) versions of the antibody.
- Another poly-A tract, after which another segment begins.

The stop codon for the final mRNA lies in the last exon of the C segment. Whether it occurs before the transmembrane regions is a matter of alternative splicing. This determines whether an anchored BCR or a free-floating antibody is made.

=== Pseudogenes ===
A V/D/J segment may be considered a pseudogene if it contains a mutation in the RSS (making it unable to be spliced in) or a mutation that prevents it from producing a functional antibody. In the latter case, it differs from a traditional pseudogene in that the protein product is expressed and made, but the resultant B cell lineage quickly dies out in the selection process.

There are also V/D/J "orphon" pseudogenes outside of the IGH@ locus, in which case their location prevents their incorporation into mRNAs by the recombination system.

There are at least two C pseudogenes in most humans: IGHGP, IGHEP1.

== Function ==
During B cell development, V(D)J recombination at the DNA level joins a single D segment with a J segment; the fused D-J exon of this partially rearranged D-J region is then joined to a V segment. The rearranged V-D-J region containing a fused V-D-J exon is then transcribed and fused at the RNA level to the IGHM constant region; this transcript encodes a mu heavy chain. Later in development B cells generate V-D-J-Cmu-Cdelta pre-messenger RNA, which is alternatively spliced to encode either a mu or a delta heavy chain.

Mature B cells in the lymph nodes undergo switch recombination, so that the fused V-D-J gene segment is brought in proximity to one of the IGHG, IGHA, or IGHE gene segments and each cell expresses either the gamma, alpha, or epsilon heavy chain. Potential recombination of many different V segments with several J segments provides a wide range of antigen recognition. Additional diversity is attained by junctional diversity, resulting from the random addition of nucleotides by terminal deoxynucleotidyl transferase, and by somatic hypermutation, which occurs during B cell maturation in the spleen and lymph nodes. Several V, D, J, and C segments are known to be incapable of encoding a protein and are considered pseudogenous gene segments (often simply referred to as pseudogenes).

== Nomenclature ==
=== V, D, J segments ===
Symbols for variable (V) immunoglobulin gene segments start with IGHV and include two or three numbers separated by dashes. Examples:

IGHV1-2, IGHV1-3, …, IGHV1-69-2, IGHV2-5, …, IGHV7-4-1

Symbols for diversity (D) immunoglobulin gene segments start with IGHD and include two numbers separated by dashes. Examples:

IGHD1-1, IGHD1-7, …, IGHD7-27

Symbols for joining (J) immunoglobulin gene segments:

IGHJ1, IGHJ2, IGHJ3, IGHJ4, IGHJ5, IGHJ6

The clusters formed by those segments may be called IGHV@, IGHD@, and IGHJ@. The @ is mandatory, especially in the case of the D segments, because otherwise it would be confused with the delta constant region.

=== Constant segments ===
Constant segments each consists of multiple exons and are often annotated as "genes". In a 5' to 3' order, the human ones are:

1. IGHM μ - IgM
2. IGHD δ IgD
3. IGHG3 γ_{3} - IgG3
4. IGHG1 γ_{1} - IgG1
5. IGHA1 α_{1} - IgA1
6. IGHG2 γ_{2} - IgG2
7. IGHG4 γ_{4} - IgG4
8. IGHE ε - IgE
9. IGHA2 α_{2} - IgA2

== Clinical significance ==
In B-cell neoplasms such as chronic lymphocytic leukemia, mutations of IGHV are associated with better response to treatment and longer survival.

(See also the pages for constant-region genes for more information.)

== See also ==
- IGHV@
