= Immune dysregulation =

Breakdown of immune system processes

Immune dysregulation is any proposed or confirmed breakdown or maladaptive change in molecular control of immune system processes. For example, dysregulation is a component in the pathogenesis of autoimmune diseases and some cancers. Immune system dysfunction, as seen in IPEX syndrome leads to immune dysfunction, polyendocrinopathy, enteropathy, X-linked (IPEX). IPEX typically presents during the first few months of life with diabetes mellitus, intractable diarrhea, failure to thrive, eczema, and hemolytic anemia. unrestrained or unregulated immune response.

== IPEX syndrome ==
IPEX (Immune dysregulation, polyendocrinopathy, enteropathy, X-linked syndrome) is a syndrome caused by a genetic mutation in the FOXP3 gene, which encodes a major transcription factor of regulatory T cells (Tregs). Such a mutation leads to dysfunctional Tregs and, as a result, autoimmune diseases. The classic clinical manifestations are enteropathy, type I diabetes mellitus and eczema. Various other autoimmune diseases or hypersensitivity are common in other individuals with IPEX syndrome. In addition to autoimmune diseases, individuals experience higher immune reactivity (e.g. chronic dermatitis) and susceptibility to infections. Individuals also develop autoimmune diseases at a young age.

== Other genetic syndromes associated with immune dysregulation ==
=== APECED ===
Autoimmune polyendocrinopathy-candidiasis-endodermal dystrophy (APECED) is a syndrome caused by a mutation in AIRE (autoimmune regulator). Typical manifestations of APECED are mucocutaneous candidiasis and multiple endocrine autoimmune diseases. APECED causes loss of central immune tolerance.

=== Omenn syndrome ===
Omenn syndrome manifests as GVHD (graft versus host disease)-like autoimmune disease. Immune dysregulation is caused by increased IgE production. The syndrome is caused by mutations in the RAG1, RAG2, IL2RG, IL7RA or RMRP genes. The number of immune cells is usually normal in this syndrome, but functionality is reduced

=== Wiskott-Aldrich syndrome ===
Wiskott-Aldrich syndrome is caused by a mutation in the WAS gene. It manifests itself as a higher susceptibility to infections, eczema, more frequent development of autoimmune hemolytic anemia, neutropenia and arthritis.

== T-cell immunodeficiency ==
Partial T cell immunodeficiency is characterized by an incomplete reduction in T cell number or activity. In contrast to severe T cell immunodeficiency, some of T-cell ability to respond to infections can be maintained. T-cell immunodeficiencies tend to be associated with autoimmune diseases or hyperreactivity and increased IgE production. Mutations tend to be in genes for cytokines (such as IL-7), TCRs, or proteins important for somatic recombination and antigen presentation.

Additional T cell-associated immune dysregulation may be due to a mutation in CTLA-4. CTLA-4 is essential for the negative regulation of the immune response and its loss leads to dysregulation and autoimmune diseases. The disease is characterized by hypogammaglobulinemia, frequent infections and the occurrence of autoimmune diseases. In individuals, the disease may manifest itself differently, with in some cases only a partial reduction in the number of Tregs, in others the ability to bind CTLA-4 ligand has been reduced, resulting in disruption homeostasis of effector T and B cells. The inheritance of this syndrome is autosomal dominant with incomplete penetration.

== Immune dysregulation associated with stress ==
Chronic stress at various stages of life can lead to chronic inflammation and immune dysregulation. Individuals with high stress in childhood (abuse, neglect, etc.) are at higher risk of cardiovascular disease, type II diabetes, osteoporosis, rheumatoid arthritis and other problems associated with immune dysregulation in adulthood. Overall, individuals with higher childhood stress increases the risk of chronic inflammation in adulthood. Higher levels of IL-6 and TNF-α are then noted in stressed individuals. Chronic stress in childhood also promotes the development of proinflammatory types of monocytes and macrophages and they also develop resistance to anti-inflammatory agent (e.g. cortisol). Traumatized individuals also have higher antibody titers to viruses such as Herpes simplex virus, Epstein–Barr virus, or Cytomegalovirus than individuals without chronic stress.

== Aging of the immune system ==
Dysregulation of the immune system is also associated with immunosenescence, which arises due to aging. Immunosenescence is manifested by a decrease in reactivity to vaccination or infection, an impaired ability of T and B lymphocytes to activate and proliferate, or a lower ability of antigen presentation by dendritic cells. In immunosenescence, memory and effector T cells accumulate at the expense of naïve T cells. The lack of naïve T lymphocytes is the cause of low plasticity of the immune system in the elderly. In aging of the immune system is also a decrease in central tolerance and an increase in the number of autoreactive T cells. B cells also have a decreased repertoire of naïve cells and an increase in memory B cells. They also have reduced the production of antibodies against antigens. In immunosenescence, here is a change in the individual subtypes of immunoglobulins. IgM and IgD levels decrease while IgG1, IgG2, and IgG3 levels increase. IgA is higher in the form of monomers in serum but lower as a dimer on the mucosal surface. The overall accumulation of both effector T and B cells is due to the presence of chronic inflammation due to long-term exposure to antigens. In immunosenescence is also a reduced ability to apoptosis, which promotes the survival of memory cells. In old age, innate immunity cells are also affected, when activated cells have a lower ability to return to a quiescent state, only effector functions decrease. Elderly people show poor NK cell reactivity and impaired ability of antigen presentation by dendritic cells. In macrophages, the ability of phagocytosis is reduced and the M2 phenotype of macrophages (alternatively activated) is promoted. Immunosenescence also results in increased production of some immune mediators, such as proinflammatory IL-6 or IL-1. There may also be higher production of anti-inflammatory IL-10 or IL-4. In old age, the ability to heal wounds also decreases, leading to a susceptibility to further infections at the site of injury. The aging of the immune system is also supported by chronic infections, oxidative stress, or the production and accumulation of reactive oxygen species (ROS). The increase in the proportion of memory cells is also affected by cytomegalovirus infection. A chronic pro-inflammatory condition in an aging organism is also referred to as inflammaging. It is a long-term, low-grade systemic inflammation present without the presence of infection.

== Dysregulation of the immune system in response to toxins ==
Immune dysregulation can also be caused by toxins. For example, in environmental workers, increased exposure to pesticides (such as DDT, organophosphate, amides, phthalamides, etc.) disrupts immune system responses. The resulting damage depends on the individual's age, dose and time of toxin exposure. At a young age and in adolescents, there are significant negative effects even with a lower dose of toxins. However, the ability to break down toxic substances and the resulting impact on the organism is also related to the metabolism and genetic equipment of the individual. Toxins can act directly on the cellular component of immunity, or by their metabolites, or they can promote reactive oxygen species (ROS) in the body, or by depletion of antioxidants or oxidative stress. The most common clinical manifestations are immunosuppression, hypersensitivity, autoimmune diseases, but also support for the Th2 response and the development of allergies, or support for chronic inflammation. Conventional toxins and irritants in the environment, such as saliva enzymes of blood-feeding parasites, insect poisons, or irritants in plants, can also cause allergic reactions. These substances can disrupt cell membranes, activate cell receptors, aggregate or degrade certain proteins, or disrupt the mucosal surface layer. The immune system often responds to these substances with reactions that lead to the removal of an irritant substance from the body, such as itching, coughing, sneezing, or vomiting. Combining the action of several toxins at the same time can increase the negative effects, but in some cases the effects of the toxins can cancel each other out.

== Allergy ==
Allergic reactions are misdirected reactions of the immune system to substances commonly found in the environment. Allergens elicit a The immune response, including the involvement of IgE, mast cells, Innate lymphoid cells 2 (ILC2), eosinophils, and basophils. Allergy symptoms are often related to the body's efforts to expel the allergen from the body and to protect it from further exposure to the allergen. Allergic reactions increase the production of mucus by goblet cells on the mucosa. The production of mucus is promoted by IL-13 from ILC2 and Th2 cells. Higher mucus production then creates stronger barrier protection and supports runny nose, coughing, or sneezing. Removal of the allergen from the body by sneezing, coughing, vomiting, or diarrhea is enabled by the activation of peristalsis and contractions of the smooth muscles of the digestive and respiratory systems. Activation of smooth muscles occurs after the action of histamine, which is released by mast cells. Manifestations of allergies generally aim to eliminate the body's allergen. This is also related to hearing the flushing of antigens in the eyes or to attempts to achieve mechanical removal of the surface of the organism.

Allergies can be caused by genetic and environmental factors. Some theories support the view that allergies enter as protection against environmental substances that can disrupt the body, such as insect venom. Another possibility of activating an allergic reaction is the similarity of some allergens to the molecular patterns of parasites against which the immune system also uses a type 2 immune response. The hygiene hypothesis then relates to changes in lifetime exposure to pathogens in developed countries. In the case of insufficient exposure to pathogens and insufficient stimulation of the Th1 response during an individual's development, the balance between Th1 and Th2 type responses may predominate to proallergic Th2. The theory is supported by the more frequent occurrence of allergies in developed countries compared to developing countries, but also by the higher incidence of allergies in cities compared to villages, where individuals can meet with pathogens of farm animals. Children from small families are also more likely to have allergies than children from families with more children, where there is more frequent contact with pathogens from siblings. Another environmental factor that may promote the predisposition to allergies is a reduction in the diversity of the microbiome – this affects the diet of individuals, but also the diet of the mother during pregnancy, method of delivery, breastfeeding, antibiotics, and the presence of domestic or farm animals in the normal life of individuals.
