= Transib =

Transib is a superfamily of interspersed repeats DNA transposons. It was named after the Trans-Siberian Express. It is similar to EnSpm/CACTA.

Transib was first described in 2003, discovered in the Drosophila melanogaster genome. It usually encodes a single protein, DDE transcriptase. An intact element including terminal inverted repeats (TIR) was found in 2008 in the Helicoverpa zea genome. Divergent clades of this superfamily has since been discovered and dubbed Transib and TransibSU (for sea urchin); Chapaev and Chapaev3 of the CACTA superfamily are sometimes included too. The differences lie in the domain organization of the core transcriptase; TransibSU is also notable for having RAG2-like proteins.

Transib is notable as the source of the two Recombination-activating genes. An active transposon with RAG1/2-like genes ("ProtoRAG"; PDB: 6B40) has been discovered in B. belcheri (Chinese lancelet). The TIRs are structurally similar to Recombination signal sequences (RSS). The heptamer bears the consensus CACWRTG, while the nonamer is more divergent. Lancelet RAG1L/TIR does not cross-recognize animal RAG1/RSS due to differences in the nonamer. Psectrotarsia flava (a moth) also has such a transposon. It lacks the nonamer, indicating the nonamer's more recent evolution.
