= Immunoglobulin G =

Antibody isotype

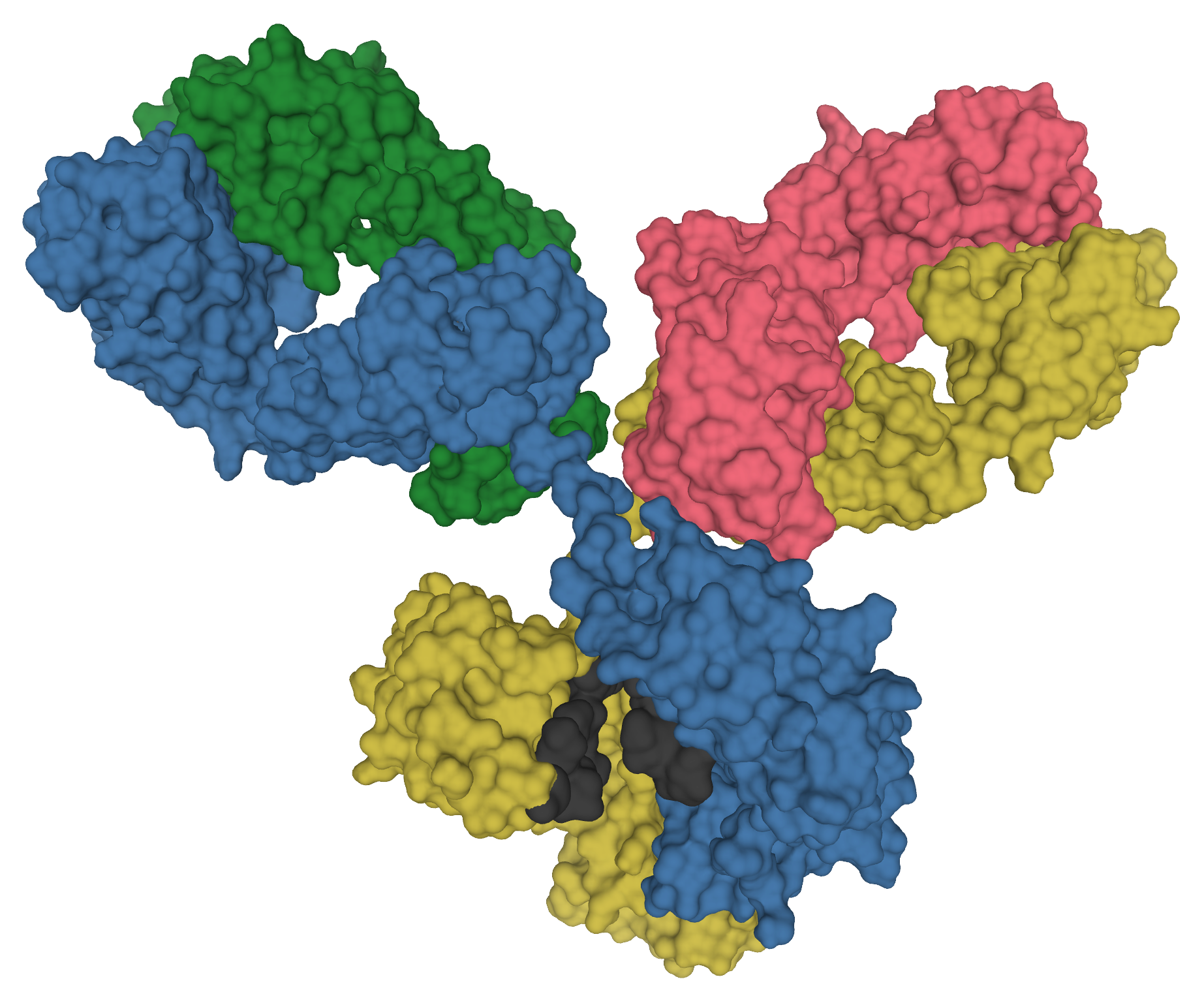
The water-accessible surface area of an IgG antibody

Immunoglobulin G (IgG) is a type of antibody. Representing approximately 75% of serum antibodies in humans, IgG is the most common type of antibody found in blood circulation. IgG molecules are created and released by plasma B cells. Each IgG antibody has two paratopes.

== Function ==
Antibodies are major components of humoral immunity. IgG is the main type of antibody found in blood and extracellular fluid, allowing it to control infection of body tissues. By binding many kinds of pathogens such as viruses, bacteria, and fungi, IgG protects the body from infection.

It does this through several mechanisms:

- IgG-mediated binding of pathogens causes their immobilization and binding together via agglutination; IgG coating of pathogen surfaces (known as opsonization) allows their recognition and ingestion by phagocytic immune cells, leading to the elimination of the pathogen itself;
- IgG activates the classical pathway of the complement system, a cascade of immune protein production that results in pathogen elimination;
- IgG also binds and neutralizes toxins;
- IgG also plays an important role in antibody-dependent cell-mediated cytotoxicity (ADCC) and intracellular antibody-mediated proteolysis, in which it binds to TRIM21 (the receptor with greatest affinity to IgG in humans) in order to direct marked virions to the proteasome in the cytosol;
- IgG is also associated with type II and type III hypersensitivity reactions.

IgG antibodies are generated following class switching and maturation of the antibody response; thus, they participate predominantly in the secondary immune response.

IgG is secreted as a small monomer, allowing it to easily diffuse into tissues. It is the only antibody isotype that has receptors to facilitate passage through the human placenta, thereby providing protection to the fetus in utero. Along with IgA secreted in the breast milk, residual IgG absorbed through the placenta provides the neonate with humoral immunity before its own immune system develops. IgA predominates in human colostrum and milk; IgG predominates in bovine colostrum and milk.

During the first months of life, maternally derived IgG provides passive protection against some pathogens, to which the mother has developed antibodies through infection or vaccination. This protection gradually declines as maternal antibodies are degraded, with its duration varying according to antibody specificity and the amount transferred across the placenta. Maternal IgG helps protect infants while their own immune responses mature.

IgG is also involved in regulating allergic reactions. According to Finkelman, there are two pathways of systemic anaphylaxis: antigens can cause systemic anaphylaxis in mice through classic pathway by cross-linking IgE bound to the mast cell receptor FcεRI, stimulating the release of both histamine and platelet activating factor (PAF). In the alternative pathway, antigens form complexes with IgG, which then cross-link the macrophage receptor FcγRIII, stimulating only PAF release.

IgG antibodies can prevent IgE-mediated anaphylaxis by intercepting a specific antigen before it binds to IgE on mast cells. Consequently, IgG antibodies block systemic anaphylaxis induced by small amounts of antigen, but can mediate systemic anaphylaxis induced by larger amounts.

== Structure ==
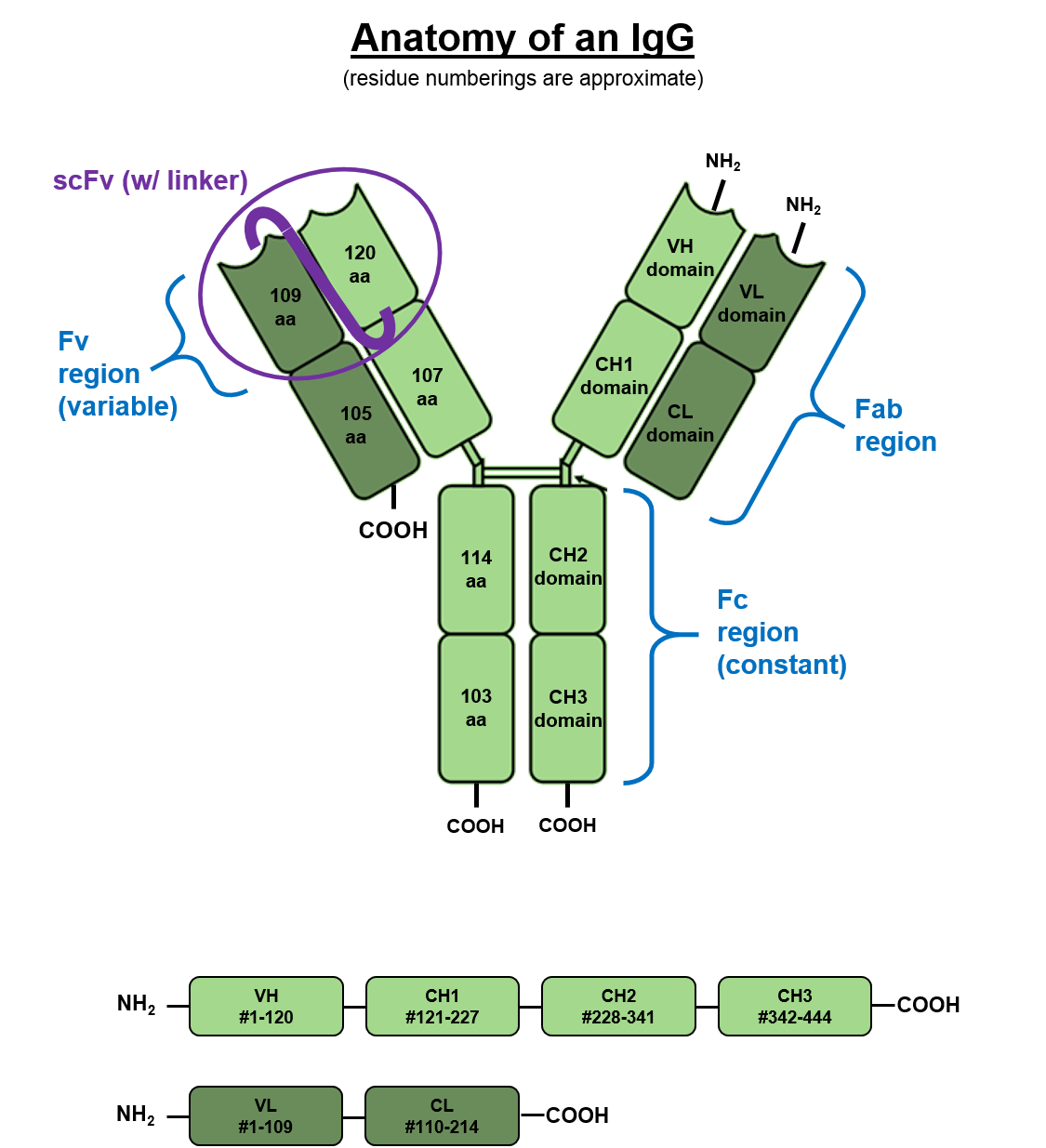
The various regions and domains of a typical IgG

IgG antibodies are large globular proteins made of four peptide chains; two identical γ (gamma) heavy chains of about 50 kDa and two identical light chains of about 25 kDa. The resulting tetrameric quaternary structure, therefore, has a total molecular weight of about 150 kDa. The two heavy chains are linked to each other and to a light chain each by disulfide bonds. The resulting tetramer has two identical halves, which together form a Y-like shape. Each end of the fork contains an identical antigen binding site. The various regions and domains of a typical IgG are depicted in the figure "Anatomy of an IgG."

The Fc regions of IgGs bear a highly conserved N-glycosylation site at asparagine 297 in the constant region of the heavy chain. The N-glycans attached to this site are predominantly core-fucosylated biantennary structures of the complex type. In addition, small amounts of these N-glycans also bear bisecting GlcNAc and α-2,6-linked sialic acid residues. The N-glycan composition in IgG has been linked to several autoimmune, infectious and metabolic diseases.

== Subclasses ==
There are four IgG subclasses (IgG1, 2, 3, and 4) in humans, named in order of their abundance in serum (IgG1 being the most abundant).

Subclasses of immunoglobulin G
Name	Percentage	Crosses placenta easily	Complement activator	Binds to Fc receptor on phagocytic cells	Half life
IgG1	66%	yes (1.47)*	second-highest	high affinity	21 days
IgG2	23%	no (0.8)*	third-highest	extremely low affinity	21 days
IgG3	7%	yes (1.17)*	highest	high affinity	7 days
IgG4	4%	yes (1.15)*	no	intermediate affinity	21 days
* Quota cord/maternity concentrations blood. Based on data from a Japanese study on 228 mothers.

Note: The affinity of IgG for Fcγ receptors on phagocytic cells varies among IgG subclasses and receptor types. Although the four human IgG subclasses share more than 90% amino-acid sequence identity, they differ particularly in their hinge and upper CH2 regions. These structural differences contribute to variation in flexibility, Fcγ receptor binding and complement activation.

Given the opposing properties of the IgG subclasses (fixing and failing to fix complement; binding and failing to bind FcR), and the fact that the immune response to most antigens includes a mix of all four subclasses, it has been difficult to understand how IgG subclasses can work together to provide protective immunity. In 2013, the Temporal Model of human IgE and IgG function was proposed. This model suggests that IgG3 (and IgE) appear early in a response. Although of relatively low affinity, IgG3 allows IgG-mediated defences to join IgM-mediated defences in clearing foreign antigens. Subsequently, higher affinity IgG1 and IgG2 are produced. The relative balance of these subclasses, in any immune complexes that form, helps determine the strength of the inflammatory processes that follow. Finally, if antigen persists, high-affinity IgG4 is produced, which dampens inflammation by helping to curtail FcR-mediated processes.

The relative ability of different IgG subclasses to fix complement may explain why some anti-donor antibody responses do harm a graft after organ transplantation.

In a mouse model of autoantibody-mediated anaemia using IgG isotype switch variants of an anti-erythrocytes autoantibody, it was found that mouse IgG2a was superior to IgG1 in activating complement. Moreover, it was found that the IgG2a isotype was able to interact very efficiently with FcgammaR. As a result, 20 times higher doses of IgG1, in relationship to IgG2a autoantibodies, were required to induce autoantibody mediated pathology. Mouse and human IgG subclasses with the same designation are not necessarily functionally equivalent; consequently, extrapolation from mouse studies to human antibody function requires caution. IgG subclasses differ in their abilities to activate complement and bind Fcγ receptors.

== Role in diagnosis ==
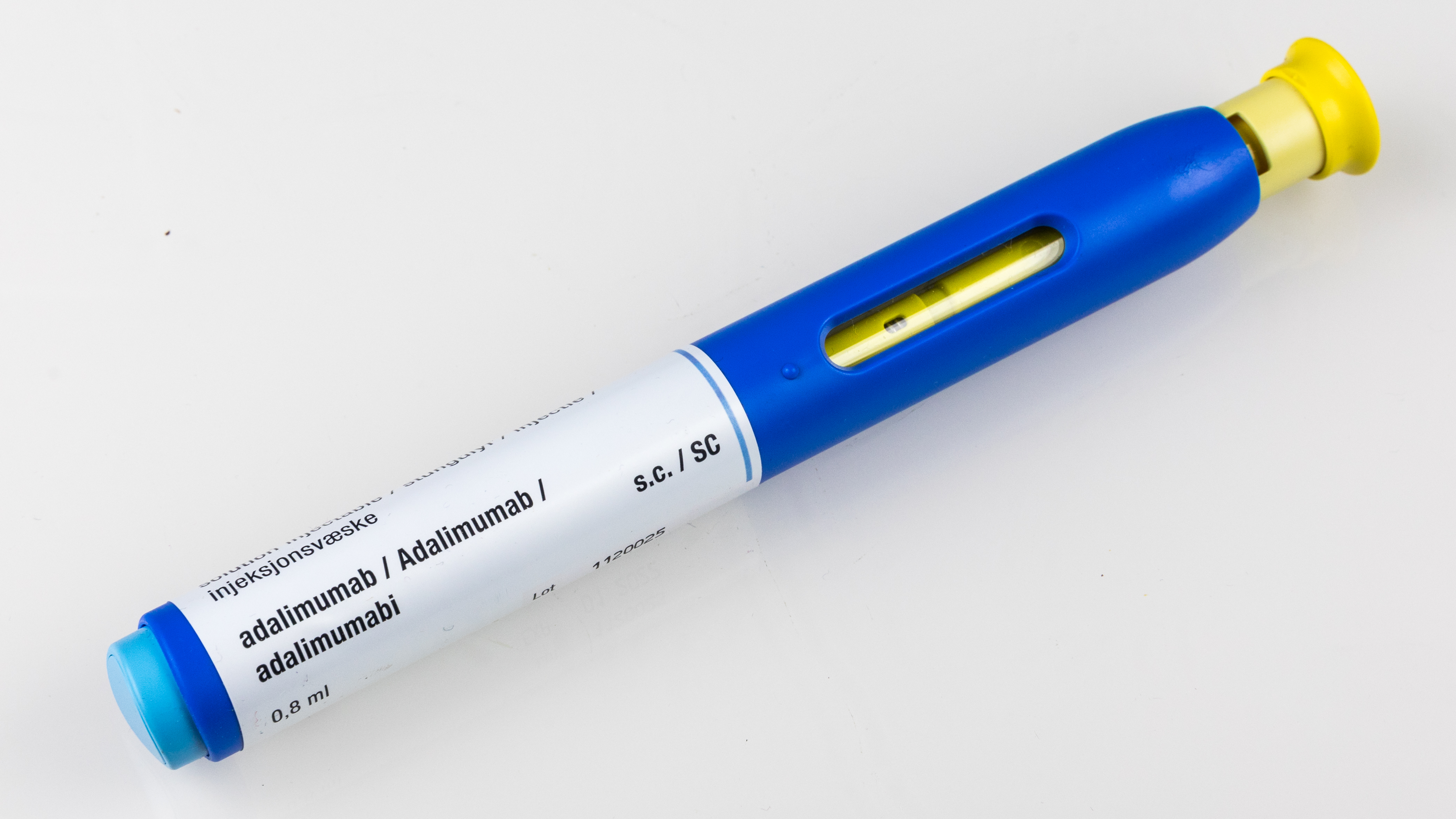
Adalimumab is an IgG antibody.

The measurement of immunoglobulin G can be a diagnostic tool for certain conditions, such as autoimmune hepatitis, if indicated by certain symptoms. Clinically, measured IgG antibody levels are generally considered to be indicative of an individual's immune status to particular pathogens. A common example of this practice is titers drawn to demonstrate serologic immunity to measles, mumps, and rubella (MMR), hepatitis B virus, and varicella (chickenpox), among others.

Testing of IgG is not indicated for diagnosis of allergy, and there is no evidence that it has any relationship to food intolerances.

== See also ==
- Epitope
- IgG4-related disease
- Immunoglobulin A (IgA)
- Immunoglobulin E (IgE)
- Immunoglobulin M (IgM)
