= RAG1 =

Protein-coding gene in the species Homo sapiens

Identifiers
- Aliases: RAG1, RAG-1, RNF74, recombination activating gene 1, recombination activating 1
- External IDs: OMIM: 179615; MGI: 97848; GeneCards: RAG1
Enzyme activity
EC #	BRENDA	ExPASy	KEGG	MetaCyc
2.3.2.27	↗	↗	↗	↗

Gene location (Human)
Chr.	Chromosome 11 (human)
Band	11p12	Start	36,510,709 bp
Band	11p12	End	36,593,156 bp

Gene location (Mouse)
Chr.	Chromosome 2 (mouse)
Band	2 E2|2 53.88 cM	Start	101,468,627 bp
Band	2 E2|2 53.88 cM	End	101,479,846 bp
RNA expression pattern
Bgee	Human / Mouse (ortholog); Top expressed in: thymus; buccal mucosa cell; testicle; bone marrow; spleen; apex of heart; tendon of biceps brachii; stromal cell of endometrium; bone marrow cell; right adrenal cortex / Top expressed in: thymus; tibiofemoral joint; bone marrow; body of femur; granulocyte; sternocleidomastoid muscle; inner cell mass; sexually immature organism; trachea; lens; More reference expression data
BioGPS	n/a
Gene ontology
Molecular function	DNA binding; sequence-specific DNA binding; protein homodimerization activity; ubiquitin protein ligase activity; histone binding; zinc ion binding; metal ion binding; ubiquitin-protein transferase activity; protein binding; catalytic activity; nuclease activity; endonuclease activity; hydrolase activity; transferase activity; identical protein binding; double-stranded DNA endodeoxyribonuclease activity
Cellular component	nucleoplasm; nucleus; DNA recombinase complex; endodeoxyribonuclease complex
Biological process	positive regulation of T cell differentiation; histone monoubiquitination; DNA recombination; negative regulation of cysteine-type endopeptidase activity involved in apoptotic process; adaptive immune response; T cell differentiation in thymus; nucleic acid phosphodiester bond hydrolysis; thymus development; negative regulation of thymocyte apoptotic process; T cell homeostasis; negative regulation of T cell apoptotic process; immune response; V(D)J recombination; pre-B cell allelic exclusion; B cell differentiation; metabolism; regulation of T cell differentiation; protein autoubiquitination; visual learning; regulation of behavioral fear response; chromatin organization
Sources:Amigo / QuickGO
Orthologs
Databases	NCBI: entry; OMA: entry
Species	Human	Mouse
Entrez	5896	19373
Ensembl	ENSG00000166349	ENSMUSG00000061311
UniProt	P15918	P15919
RefSeq (mRNA)	NM_000448	NM_009019
RefSeq (protein)	NP_000439; NP_001364206; NP_001364207; NP_001364208; NP_001364209	NP_033045
Location (UCSC)	Chr 11: 36.51 – 36.59 Mb	Chr 2: 101.47 – 101.48 Mb
PubMed search
- Wikidata
View/Edit Human	View/Edit Mouse

Recombination activating gene 1 also known as RAG-1 is a protein that in humans is encoded by the RAG1 gene.

The RAG1 and RAG2 genes are largely conserved in humans. 55.99% and 55.98% of the encoded amino acids contain no reported variants, respectively.

== Function ==
The protein encoded by this gene is involved in antibody and T-cell receptor V(D)J recombination. RAG-1 is involved in recognition of the DNA substrate, but stable binding and cleavage activity also requires RAG-2. The RAG-1/2 complex recognizes recombination signal sequences (RSSs) that flank the V, D and J regions in the genes that encode the heavy and light chains of antibodies and components of T-cell receptors. The complex binds to the RSSs and nicks the DNA. This leads to the removal of the intervening DNA and the eventual ligation of the V, D and J sequences. Defects in this gene can cause several different diseases.

== Clinical significance ==
Because of these effects, Rag1 deletion is used in mouse models of disease to impair T cell and B cell development, and functionally deletes mature T and B cells from the immune system.

In humans, RAG deficiency was first recognised as a form of immune dysregulation known as Omenn syndrome. RAG deficiency is considered an autosomal recessive disease. The disorder is generally identified in infants. Complete loss-of-function in RAG1/2, the main components responsible for V(D)J recombination activity, produces severe immunodeficiency in humans. Hypomorphic RAG variants can retain partial recombination activity and result in a distinct phenotype of combined immunodeficiency with granuloma and/or autoimmunity (CID-G/A), as well as other milder forms, such as antibody deficiency, Idiopathic CD4^{+} T lymphopenia or vasculitis. RAG deficiency can be measured by in vitro quantification of recombination activity. 71 RAG1 and 39 RAG2 variants have been functionally assayed to date (2019) (less than 10% of the potential point mutations that may cause disease). However, top candidate variants have been ranked by their predicted clinical relevance.

== Use in phylogenetics ==
RAG1 is frequently used as a marker in phylogenetic studies. That is, RAG1 sequences are often used to construct phylogenetic trees in order to investigate the relationships between species or higher taxa. Although the selection of RAG1 was somewhat arbitrary, it is one of several universal nuclear protein-coding loci (NPCL) that are applicable across diverse taxa and show good phylogenetic discrimination. For instance, RAG1 has been successfully used to make phylogenetic inferences within all major groups of fish and reptiles. In many cases, RAG1 is used together with mitochondrial sequences as these evolve much faster and thus provide information about more closely related taxa. A combination of nuclear and mitochondrial DNA is usually recommended due to fact that they may yield discrepant phylogenetic relationships, a phenomenon called mito-nuclear discordance.
