= IGL@ =

Protein-coding gene in the species Homo sapiens

IGL

Identifiers
- Aliases: IGL, IGL@, IGLC6, immunoglobulin lambda locus
- External IDs: GeneCards: IGL

Gene location (Human)
| Chr. | Chromosome 22 (human) |
| Band | 22q11.22 | Start | 22,026,076 bp |
| Band | 22q11.22 | End | 22,922,913 bp |
Orthologs
| Databases | NCBI: entry |
| Species | Human | Mouse |
| Entrez | 3535 | n/a |
| Ensembl | n/a | n/a |
| UniProt | n a | n/a |
| RefSeq (mRNA) | n/a | n/a |
| RefSeq (protein) | n/a | n/a |
| Location (UCSC) | Chr 22: 22.03 – 22.92 Mb | n/a |
| PubMed search | | n/a |
- Wikidata
| View/Edit Human |

Immunoglobulin lambda locus, also known as IGL@, is a region on the q arm of human chromosome 22, region 11.22 (22q11.22) that contains genes for the lambda light chains of antibodies (or immunoglobulins).

Immunoglobulins recognize foreign antigens and initiate immune responses such as phagocytosis and the complement system. Each immunoglobulin molecule consists of two identical heavy chains and two identical light chains. There are two classes of light chains, kappa and lambda. This region represents the germline organization of the lambda light chain locus. The locus includes V (variable), J (joining), and C (constant) segments.

== Structure ==
The lambda locus consists of two separate gene clusters.

The constant genes and joining gene-segments are found in the IGLC region, arranged in head-to-tail cassettes that each contain a single J and C "gene". There is a recombination signal sequence (RSS) before the J gene. In the reference human genome there are seven such casettes, four of which are functional. Some people have fewer or extra copies that may or may not be functional.

The variable segments are found in the IGLV regiona - a gene cluster interrupted by a number of non-IGLV genes. Each gene consits of an LP1 (leader part 1, first half of a signal peptide) exon, an intron, a V exon (which translates to LP2 - the other part of the signal peptide - and the antigen-binding variable region), and an RSS.

== Function ==
During B cell development, a VJ recombination event at the DNA level joins a single V segment with a J segment at the RSS. After RNA splicing (incl. intron removal) the end product is a V-J-C mRNA. Recombination of many different V segments with several J segments provides a wide range of antigen recognition. There is no diversity in J/C combination, because the C gene used can only ever be the one that follows the selected J gene.

Additional diversity is attained by junctional diversity, resulting from the random additional of nucleotides by terminal deoxynucleotidyltransferase, and by somatic hypermutation, which occurs during B cell maturation in the spleen and lymph nodes. Several V segments and three C segments are known to be incapable of encoding a protein and are considered pseudogenes. The locus also includes several non-immunoglobulin genes, many of which are pseudogenes or are predicted by automated computational analysis or homology to other species.

== Genes ==
The immunoglobulin lambda locus contains the following genes:

- IGLC@ – constant group
  - IGLC1 – immunoglobulin lambda constant 1 (Mcg marker)
  - IGLC2 – immunoglobulin lambda constant 2 (Kern-Oz- marker)
  - IGLC3 – immunoglobulin lambda constant 3 (Kern-Oz+ marker)
  - IGLC7 – immunoglobulin lambda constant 7
- IGLJ@ – joining group
  - IGLJn – immunoglobulin lambda joining n
  - IGLJ1, IGLJ2, IGLJ3, IGLJ6, IGLJ7
- IGLV@ – variable group
  - IGLVm-n – immunoglobulin lambda variable n-m
  - IGLV1-36, IGLV1-40, IGLV1-44, IGLV1-47, IGLV1-51, IGLV1-62
  - IGLV2-5, IGLV2-8, IGLV2-11, IGLV2-14, IGLV2-18, IGLV2-23
  - IGLV3-1, IGLV3-10, IGLV3-12, IGLV3-16, IGLV3-19, IGLV3-21, IGLV3-25, IGLV3-27
  - IGLV4-3, IGLV4-60, IGLV4-69
  - IGLV5-37, IGLV5-39, IGLV5-45, IGLV5-52
  - IGLV6-57
  - IGLV7-43
  - IGLV9-49
  - IGLV10-54
