= IGK =

IGK may refer to

- Indo-Greek Kingdom
- IGK@, Immunoglobulin kappa locus
- Islamic Group in Kurdistan
