= IGK@ =

Protein-coding gene in the species Homo sapiens

IGK

Identifiers
- Aliases: IGK, IGK@, immunoglobulin kappa locus
- External IDs: GeneCards: IGK
Orthologs
Databases	NCBI: entry
Species	Human	Mouse
Entrez	50802	n/a
Ensembl	n/a	n/a
UniProt	n a	n/a
RefSeq (mRNA)	n/a	n/a
RefSeq (protein)	n/a	n/a
Location (UCSC)	n/a	n/a
PubMed search		n/a
- Wikidata
View/Edit Human

Immunoglobulin kappa locus, also known as IGK@, is a region on the p arm of human chromosome 2, region 11.2 (2p11.2), that contains genes for the kappa (κ) light chains of antibodies (or immunoglobulins).

Immunoglobulins recognize foreign antigens and initiate immune responses such as phagocytosis and the complement system. Each immunoglobulin molecule consists of two identical heavy chains and two identical light chains. There are two classes of light chains, kappa and lambda. This region represents the germline organization of the lambda light chain locus. The locus includes V (variable), J (joining), and C (constant) segments.

== Structure ==
=== Arrangement of genes ===
In the human reference genome, the IGK locus is 1,820 kb long (including the space). From 5' to 3', it consists of two gene clusters, spaced by 800 kb. The upstream cluster is 400 kb and consists of 36 IGKV loci. The downstream cluster is 600 kb and, from 5' to 3', consists of 40 IGKV loci, 5 IGKJ loci, and 1 IGKC locus. A few of these loci are known pesudogenes.

The two sub-clusters originate from a recent inverted segmental duplication of a singular cluster. There is, as a result, a one-to-one paralog relationship between many of the V genes across two clusters. Some people do not have the upstream locus and therefore have fewer V gene options. Also, some additional structural variations occur among human populations, enabled by the similarity between these two parts.

There are also 25 orphon IGHVs, V segments dispersed outside of the clusters. They are not believed to be functional due to being so far out. Some of them are not even on the same chromosome.

In mice, the Igk locus consists of three Igkv clusters, the last immediately followed by four Igkj genes (five are present, but one is a pseudogene due to a broken RSS), and a Igkc.

=== Structure of genes ===
There is a recombination signal sequence (RSS) in the intron after the last exon of each IGKV (12RSS), and an 23RSS ("RSS9") in the intron before the first exon of each IGKJ. After the last exon of IGKJ5, there is an intron-12RSS, followed by an intronic enhancer (iEk), the IGKC exon, the 3' enhancer (3' Ek). After some way out there is a weak 23-like RSS called the κ-deleting element (Kde, IGKDE).

The structure is a little more complicated in mice, as each cluster also contains CTCF-binding elements (CBEs) that regulate the wrapping of DNA. There is a strong Cer-Sis CBE pair in the space in the last cluster between Igkv and Igkj. There is also a CBE after the intron-RSS7. A KDE is also present, more commonly called Recombining Segment (RS).

== Function ==
During B cell development, a VJ recombination event at the DNA level joins a single V segment with a J segment at the RSS. After RNA splicing (incl. intron removal) the end product is a V-J-C mRNA. Recombination of many different V segments with several J segments provides a wide range of antigen recognition. Unlike the lambda chain where each J segment comes pre-glued with a C segment, the five J segments of IGK all share one C segment; this issue is resolved by RNA splicing, so that only the J segment directly pasted onto a V segment makes it into the final mRNA.

Additional diversity is attained by junctional diversity, resulting from the random additional of nucleotides by terminal deoxynucleotidyltransferase, and by somatic hypermutation, which occurs during B cell maturation in the spleen and lymph nodes. Several V segments and three C segments are known to be incapable of encoding a protein and are considered pseudogenes. The locus also includes several non-immunoglobulin genes, many of which are pseudogenes or are predicted by automated computational analysis or homology to other species.

=== Mechanism ===
The kappa light chain undergoes a more complicated recombination sequence than all other chains due to the presence of inversions: simple VJ recombination between an upstream 12RSS and a downstream 23RSS on the same DNA strand causes the deletion of everything between the two signals, but inversions, which places the signals on different DNA strands, will lead to a re-inversion when subject to cutting by the RAG enzymes. This allows multiple rounds of recombination producing multiple V-J combinations: if a combination turns out self-reactive, another is simply tried.

In a human-type genome where there are V elements pointing in two different directions, a few consecutive rounds of V-J combination could be tried before no more V-J combination can be done. If, in this case, the receptor still turns out self-reactive, the intron-RSS can recombine with Kde to disable the chain by cutting out the C part along with the enhancers. The kappa locus on the other chromosome can then be tried. If it still fails to be self-tolerant, it is again cut out, and the developing B cell tries to make a lambda light chain instead. (The C part and the enhancers can also be cut out at an earlier phase, skipping much of the V-J trying.)

Some V chains have a flipped trailing 23RSS overlapping the 12RSS. This enables intra-V recombinations independent of the J-centered recombination center. This could help improve the randomness of V incorporation, as otherwise the "scanning" V-J recombination could tend to favor segments near CBEs.

Perhaps to stabilize the process of multiple rounds of editing, some RSS sites used by the kappa chain are stronger than ones found elsewhere in the human and mouse genomes.

== Genes ==
The immunoglobulin kappa locus contains the following genes:

- IGKC: immunoglobulin kappa constant
- IGKJ@: immunoglobulin kappa joining group
  - IGKJ1, IGKJ2, IGKJ3, IGKJ4, IGKJ5
- IGKV@: immunoglobulin kappa variable group
  - IGKV1-5, IGKV1-6, IGKV1-8, IGKV1-9, IGKV1-12, IGKV1-16, IGKV1-17, IGKV1-27, IGKV1-33
  - IGKV1D-8, IGKV1D-12, IGKV1D-13, IGKV1D-16, IGKV1D-17, IGKV1D-22, IGKV1D-27, IGKV1D-32, IGKV1D-33, IGKV1D-39, IGKV1D-43
  - IGKV2-24, IGKV2-28, IGKV2-30, IGKV2-40
  - IGKV2D-26, IGKV2D-28, IGKV2D-29, IGKV2D-30, IGKV2D-40
  - IGKV3-11, IGKV3-15, IGKV3-20
  - IGKV3D-7, IGKV3D-11, IGKV3D-20
  - IGKV4-1
  - IGKV5-2
- and a number of non-functional and pseudogenes

The IGKV genes are named by similarity, not just by their order. The "D" symbols are the upstream duplication cluster and correspond one-to-one with the non-"D" symbols.
