= Psectrotarsia =

Scientific classification
- Kingdom: Animalia
- Phylum: Arthropoda
- Clade: Pancrustacea
- Class: Insecta
- Order: Lepidoptera
- Superfamily: Noctuoidea
- Family: Noctuidae
- Subfamily: Heliothinae
- Genus: Psectrotarsia; Dognin, 1907

Synonyms
- Psectrotarsia Hampson, 1908 (Note: a simultaneous junior homonym and junior synonym); Erythroecia Hampson, 1910

Genus of moths

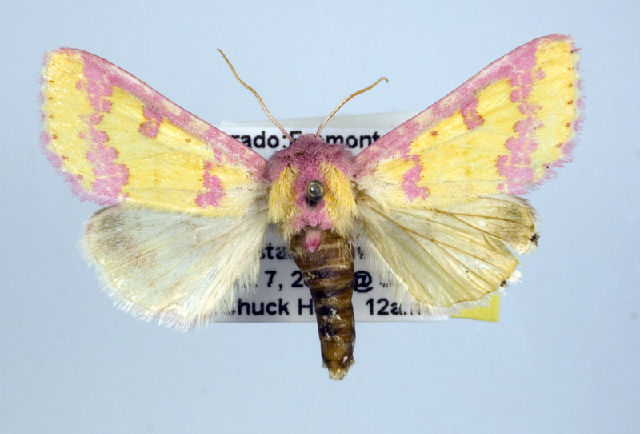
Psectrotarsia suavis

Psectrotarsia is a small New World genus of moths of the family Noctuidae, erected in 1907 by Paul Dognin. With exception of Psectrotarsia flava, species in the genus have pink forewing markings.

== Distribution and biology ==
Psectrotarsia species are known from the United States, Mexico, Guatemala and Peru. The larval host plants of most species are unknown, except for Psectrotarsia hebardi, which is known to feed on richweed.

== Species ==
Following the 2007 revision of the genus by Michael P. Pogue, the genus is considered to contain the following species:

- Psectrotarsia euposis (Dyar, 1912) - Mexico
- Psectrotarsia flava Dognin, 1907 - Peru - type species
- Psectrotarsia hebardi (Skinner, 1917) - United States (New Jersey, Ohio, Virginia)
- Psectrotarsia rhodophora (Hampson, 1910) - Guatemala
- Psectrotarsia suavis (H. Edwards, 1884) - United States, Mexico

=== Former species ===
Following the 2007 revision, two species were transferred to Copitarsia:

- Psectrotarsia fuscirena (now Copitarsia fuscirena)
- Psectrotarsia tamsi (now Copitarsia tamsi)
