= Psectrotarsia euposis =

Scientific classification
- Kingdom: Animalia
- Phylum: Arthropoda
- Class: Insecta
- Order: Lepidoptera
- Superfamily: Noctuoidea
- Family: Noctuidae
- Genus: Psectrotarsia
- Species: P. euposis

Binomial name
- Psectrotarsia euposis (Dyar, 1912)

Synonyms
- Erythroecia euposis Dyar, 1912

Species of moth

Psectrotarsia euposis is a species of moth of the family Noctuidae. It is found in several states around Mexico City.

The length of the forewings is 14.6–17.4 mm.
