= Recombination-activating gene =

recombination-activating gene 1

Identifiers
- Symbol: RAG1
- NCBI gene: 5896
- HGNC: 9831
- OMIM: 179615
- RefSeq: NM_000448
- UniProt: P15918

Other data
- Locus: Chr. 11 p13
Search for
- Structures: Swiss-model
- Domains: InterPro

recombination-activating gene 2

Identifiers
- Symbol: RAG2
- NCBI gene: 5897
- HGNC: 9832
- OMIM: 179616
- RefSeq: NM_000536
- UniProt: P55895

Other data
- Locus: Chr. 11 p13
Search for
- Structures: Swiss-model
- Domains: InterPro

Recombination-activating protein 2

Identifiers
- Symbol: RAG2
- Pfam: PF03089
- InterPro: IPR004321
Available protein structures:
- PDB: IPR004321 PF03089 (ECOD; PDBsum)
- AlphaFold: IPR004321; PF03089

Recombination-activating protein 1

Identifiers
- Symbol: RAG1
- Pfam: PF12940
- InterPro: IPR004321
Available protein structures:
- PDB: IPR004321 PF12940 (ECOD; PDBsum)
- AlphaFold: IPR004321; PF12940

The recombination-activating genes (RAGs) encode parts of a protein complex that plays important roles in the rearrangement and recombination of the genes encoding immunoglobulin and T cell receptor molecules. There are two recombination-activating genes RAG1 and RAG2, whose cellular expression is restricted to lymphocytes during their developmental stages. The enzymes encoded by these genes, RAG-1 and RAG-2, are essential to the generation of mature B cells and T cells, two types of lymphocyte that are crucial components of the adaptive immune system.

== Function ==
In the vertebrate immune system, each antibody is customized to attack one particular antigen (foreign proteins and carbohydrates) without attacking the body itself. Despite the fact that there are only two genes in the human genome that code for the variable region of antibodies, B-cells are capable of generating millions of different antibodies, which allows the immune system to respond to millions of different antigens. The immune system generates this diversity of antibodies by shuffling, cutting and recombining a few hundred genes (the VDJ genes) to create millions of permutations, in a process called V(D)J recombination. RAG-1 and RAG-2 are proteins at the ends of VDJ genes that separate, shuffle, and rejoin the VDJ genes. This shuffling takes place inside B cells and T cells during their maturation.

RAG enzymes work as a multi-subunit complex to induce cleavage of a single double stranded DNA (dsDNA) molecule between the antigen receptor coding segment and a flanking recombination signal sequence (RSS). They do this in two steps. They initially introduce a 'nick' in the 5' (upstream) end of the RSS heptamer (a conserved region of 7 nucleotides) that is adjacent to the coding sequence, leaving behind a specific biochemical structure on this region of DNA: a 3'-hydroxyl (OH) group at the coding end and a 5'-phosphate (PO_{4}) group at the RSS end. The next step couples these chemical groups, binding the OH-group (on the coding end) to the PO_{4}-group (that is sitting between the RSS and the gene segment on the opposite strand). This produces a 5'-phosphorylated double-stranded break at the RSS and a covalently closed hairpin at the coding end. The RAG proteins remain at these junctions until other enzymes (notably, TdT) repair the DNA breaks.

The RAG proteins initiate V(D)J recombination, which is essential for the maturation of pre-B and pre-T cells. Activated mature B cells also possess two other remarkable, RAG-independent phenomena of manipulating their own DNA: so-called class-switch recombination (AKA isotype switching) and somatic hypermutation (AKA affinity maturation). Current studies have indicated that RAG-1 and RAG-2 must work in a synergistic manner to activate VDJ recombination. RAG-1 was shown to inefficiently induce recombination activity of the VDJ genes when isolated and transfected into fibroblast samples. When RAG-1 was cotransfected with RAG-2, recombination frequency increased by a 1000-fold. This finding has fostered the newly revised theory that RAG genes may not only assist in VDJ recombination, but rather, directly induce the recombinations of the VDJ genes.

== Structure ==
As with many enzymes, RAG proteins are fairly large. For example, mouse RAG-1 contains 1040 amino acids and mouse RAG-2 contains 527 amino acids. The enzymatic activity of the RAG proteins is concentrated largely in a core region; Residues 384–1008 of RAG-1 and residues 1–387 of RAG-2 retain most of the DNA cleavage activity. The RAG-1 core contains three acidic residues (D_{600}, D_{708}, and E_{962}) in what is called the DDE motif, the major active site for DNA cleavage. These residues are critical for nicking the DNA strand and for forming the DNA hairpin. Residues 384–454 of RAG-1 comprise a nonamer-binding region (NBR) that specifically binds the conserved nonamer (9 nucleotides) of the RSS and the central domain (amino acids 528–760) of RAG-1 binds specifically to the RSS heptamer. The core region of RAG-2 is predicted to form a six-bladed beta-propeller structure that appears less specific than RAG-1 for its target.

Cryo-electron microscopy structures of the synaptic RAG complexes reveal a closed dimer conformation with generation of new intermolecular interactions between two RAG1-RAG2 monomers upon DNA binding, compared to the Apo-RAG complex which constitutes as an open conformation. Both RAG1 molecules in the closed dimer are involved in the cooperative binding of the 12-RSS and 23-RSS intermediates with base specific interactions in the heptamer of the signal end. The first base of the heptamer in the signal end is flipped out to avoid the clash in the active center. Each coding end of the nicked-RSS intermediate is stabilized exclusively by one RAG1-RAG2 monomer with non-specific protein-DNA interactions. The coding end is highly distorted with one base flipped out from the DNA duplex in the active center, which facilitates the hairpin formation by a potential two-metal ion catalytic mechanism. The 12-RSS and 23-RSS intermediates are highly bent and asymmetrically bound to the synaptic RAG complex with the nonamer binding domain dimer tilts towards the nonamer of the 12-RSS but away from the nonamer of the 23-RSS, which emphasizes the 12/23 rule. Two HMGB1 molecules bind at each side of 12-RSS and 23-RSS to stabilize the highly bent RSSs. These structures elaborate the molecular mechanisms for DNA recognition, catalysis and the unique synapsis underlying the 12/23 rule, provide new insights into the RAG-associated human diseases, and represent a most complete set of complexes in the catalytic pathways of any DDE family recombinases, transposases or integrases.

== Evolution ==
Based on core sequence homology, it is believed that RAG1 evolved from a transposase from the Transib superfamily. No Transib family members include an N-terminal sequence found in RAG1, suggesting the N-terminal of RAG1 came from a separate element. The N-terminal region of RAG1 has been found in the transposable element N-RAG-TP in the sea slug, Aplysia californica, which contains the entire RAG1 N-terminal. It is likely that the full RAG1 structure was derived from the recombination between a Transib and the N-RAG-TP transposon.

A transposon with RAG2 arranged next to RAG1 has been identified in the purple sea urchin. Active Transib transposons with both RAG1 and RAG2 ("ProtoRAG") has been discovered in B. belcheri (Chinese lancelet) and Psectrotarsia flava (a moth). The terminal inverted repeats (TIR) in lancelet ProtoRAG have a heptamer-spacer-nonamer structure similar to that of RSS, but the moth ProtoRAG lacks a nonamer. The nonamer-binding regions and the nonamer sequences of lancelet ProtoRAG and animal RAG are different enough to not recognize each other. The structure of the lancelet protoRAG has been solved (PDB: 6b40), providing some understanding on what changes lead to the domestication of RAG genes.

Although the transposon origins of these genes are well-established, there is still no consensus on when the ancestral RAG1/2 locus became present in the vertebrate genome. Because agnathans (a class of jawless fish) lack a core RAG1 element, it was traditionally assumed that RAG1 invaded after the agnathan/gnathostome split 1001 to 590 million years ago (MYA). However, the core sequence of RAG1 has been identified in the echinoderm Strongylocentrotus purpuratus (purple sea urchin), the amphioxi Branchiostoma floridae (Florida lancelet). Sequences with homology to RAG1 have also been identified in Lytechinus veriegatus (green sea urchin), Patiria minata (sea star), the mollusk Aplysia californica, and protostomes including oysters, mussels, ribbon worms, and the non-bilaterian cnidarians. These findings indicate that the Transib family transposon invaded multiple times in non-vertebrate species, and invaded the ancestral jawed vertebrate genome about 500 MYA. It is hypothesized that the absence of RAG-like genes in jawless vertebrates and urochordates is due to horizontal gene transfer or gene loss in certain phylogenetic groups due to conventional vertical transmission. Recent analysis has shown the RAG phylogeny to be gradual and directional, suggesting an evolutionary path that relies on vertical transmission. This hypothesis suggests that the RAG1/2-like pair may have been present in its current form in most metazoan lineages and was lost in the jawless vertebrate and urochordate lineages. There is no evidence that the V(D)J recombination system arose earlier than the vertebrate lineage. It is currently hypothesized that the invasion of RAG1/2 is the most important evolutionary event in terms of shaping the gnathostome adaptive immune system vs. the agnathan variable lymphocyte receptor system.

== Selective pressure ==
It is still unclear what forces led to the development of a RAG1/2-mediated immune system exclusively in jawed vertebrates and not in any invertebrate species that also acquired the RAG1/2-containing transposon. Current hypotheses include two whole-genome duplication events in vertebrates, which would provide the genetic raw material for the development of the adaptive immune system, and the development of endothelial tissue, greater metabolic activity, and a decreased blood volume-to-body weight ratio, all of which are more specialized in vertebrates than invertebrates and facilitate adaptive immune responses.

== See also ==
- Omenn syndrome
- Severe combined immunodeficiency
