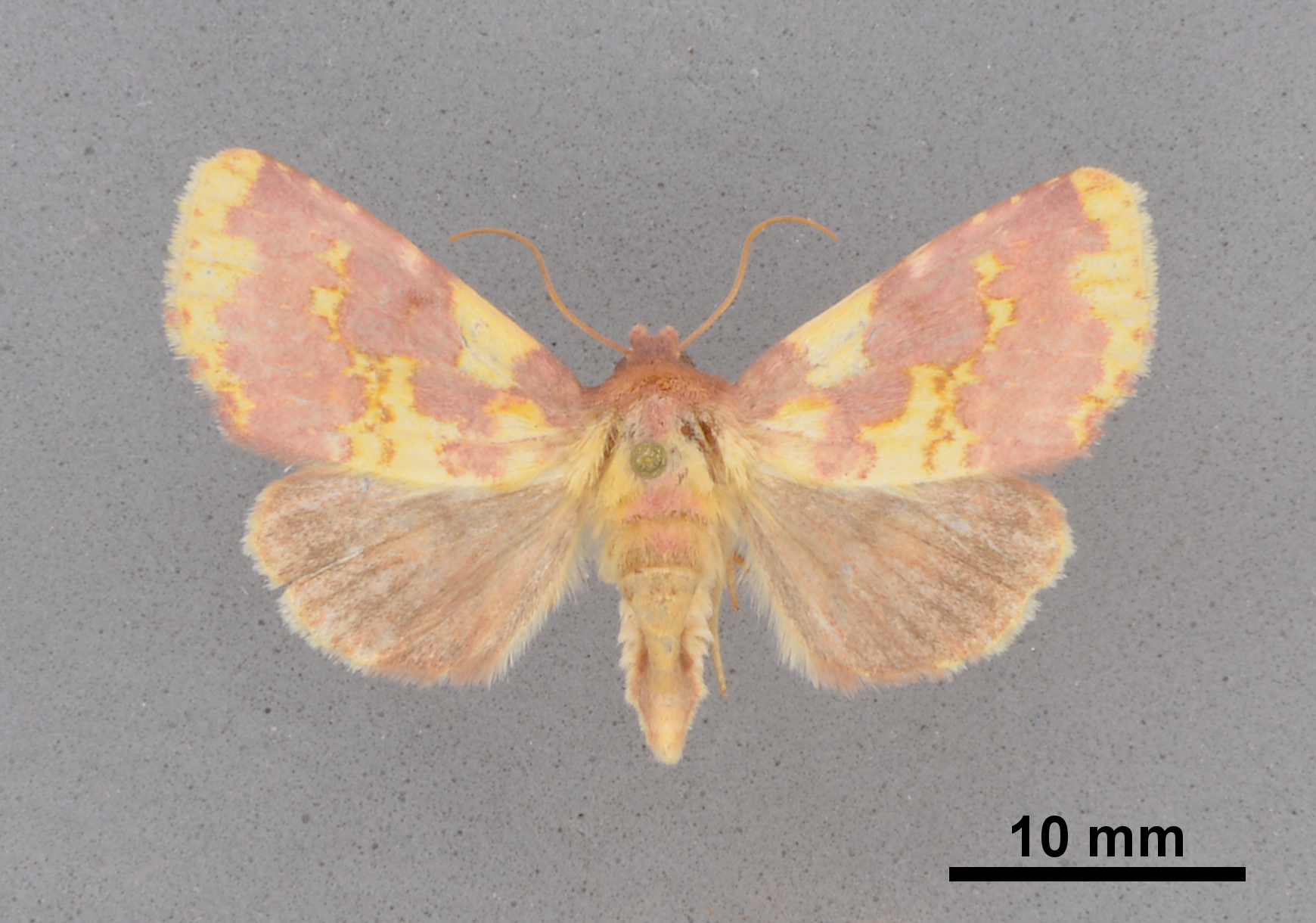

Scientific classification
- Kingdom: Animalia
- Phylum: Arthropoda
- Class: Insecta
- Order: Lepidoptera
- Superfamily: Noctuoidea
- Family: Noctuidae
- Genus: Psectrotarsia
- Species: P. hebardi

Binomial name
- Psectrotarsia hebardi (Skinner, 1917)

Synonyms
- Erythroecia hebardi Skinner, 1917

= Psectrotarsia hebardi =

Species of moth

Psectrotarsia hebardi is a species of moth of the family Noctuidae first described by Skinner in 1917. It is found in the United States in northwestern New Jersey, southern Ohio, and western Virginia.

The wingspan is 29–33 mm. Adults are on wing from August to September.

Larvae have been recorded on Collinsonia canadensis.
