= N-nucleotide =

N-nucleotides, or nontemplated nucleotides are believed to exist only to create diversity at V(D)J junctions (see V(D)J recombination) during lymphocyte development. The addition of these nucleotides is aided by an enzyme called Terminal deoxynucleotidyl transferase (TdT)
