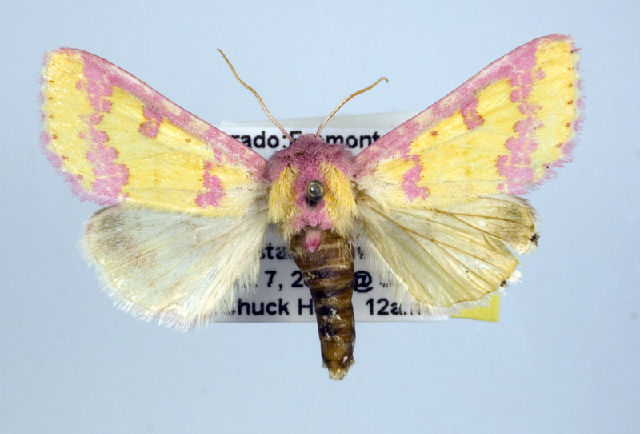

Scientific classification
- Kingdom: Animalia
- Phylum: Arthropoda
- Class: Insecta
- Order: Lepidoptera
- Superfamily: Noctuoidea
- Family: Noctuidae
- Genus: Psectrotarsia
- Species: P. suavis

Binomial name
- Psectrotarsia suavis (H. Edwards, 1884)

Synonyms
- Heliothis suavis H. Edwards, 1884; Erythroecia suavis Hampson, 1910

= Psectrotarsia suavis =

Species of moth

Psectrotarsia suavis is a species of moth of the family Noctuidae. It is found from south-western South Dakota, extreme north-eastern and western Nebraska, northern and south-western Kansas, eastern Colorado, New Mexico east of the Rocky Mountains, southern Arizona, and the panhandles of Oklahoma and Texas and in south central and south-western Texas. There are two records from Mexico, one from Chihuahua and one from San Luis Potosi.

The wingspan is 32–34 mm.
