= RAG2 =

Protein-coding gene in the species Homo sapiens

Identifiers
- Aliases: RAG2, RAG-2, recombination activating gene 2, recombination activating 2
- External IDs: OMIM: 179616; MGI: 97849; GeneCards: RAG2

Gene location (Human)
| Chr. | Chromosome 11 (human) |
| Band | 11p12 | Start | 36,575,574 bp |
| Band | 11p12 | End | 36,598,279 bp |

Gene location (Mouse)
| Chr. | Chromosome 2 (mouse) |
| Band | 2 E2|2 53.87 cM | Start | 101,455,063 bp |
| Band | 2 E2|2 53.87 cM | End | 101,462,874 bp |
RNA expression pattern
| Bgee | Human / Mouse (ortholog); Top expressed in: thymus; bone marrow; left lobe of thyroid gland; right lobe of thyroid gland; bone marrow cell; corpus callosum; granulocyte; mucosa of transverse colon; tonsil; muscle tissue / Top expressed in: thymus; granulocyte; bone marrow; heart; cochlea; exocrine gland; hepatobiliary system; liver; embryo; embryonic structure; More reference expression data |
| BioGPS | n/a |
Gene ontology
| Molecular function | DNA binding; ubiquitin protein ligase activity; zinc ion binding; chromatin binding; phosphatidylinositol-3,5-bisphosphate binding; metal ion binding; phosphatidylinositol-3,4-bisphosphate binding; methylated histone binding; phosphatidylinositol binding; phosphatidylinositol-4,5-bisphosphate binding; phosphatidylinositol-3,4,5-trisphosphate binding; sequence-specific DNA binding |
| Cellular component | nucleoplasm; nucleus; DNA recombinase complex |
| Biological process | DNA recombination; B cell homeostatic proliferation; T cell differentiation in thymus; positive regulation of organ growth; T cell differentiation; B cell lineage commitment; protein ubiquitination; V(D)J recombination; pre-B cell allelic exclusion; B cell differentiation; T cell lineage commitment; defense response to bacterium; chromatin organization |
Sources:Amigo / QuickGO
Orthologs
| Databases | NCBI: entry; OMA: entry |
| Species | Human | Mouse |
| Entrez | 5897 | 19374 |
| Ensembl | ENSG00000175097 | ENSMUSG00000032864 |
| UniProt | P55895 | P21784 |
| RefSeq (mRNA) | NM_000536; NM_001243785; NM_001243786 | NM_009020 |
| RefSeq (protein) | NP_000527; NP_001230714; NP_001230715 | NP_033046 |
| Location (UCSC) | Chr 11: 36.58 – 36.6 Mb | Chr 2: 101.46 – 101.46 Mb |
| PubMed search |
- Wikidata
| View/Edit Human | View/Edit Mouse |

Recombination activating gene 2 protein (also known as RAG-2) is a lymphocyte-specific protein encoded by the RAG2 gene on human chromosome 11. Together with the RAG1 protein, RAG2 forms a V(D)J recombinase, a protein complex required for the process of V(D)J recombination during which the variable regions of immunoglobulin and T cell receptor genes are assembled in developing B and T lymphocytes. Therefore, RAG2 is essential for the generation of mature B and T lymphocytes.

== Structure ==
RAG2 is a 527-amino acid long protein. Its N-terminal part is thought to form a six-bladed propeller in the active core. RAG2 is conserved among all species that carry out V(D)J recombination and its expression pattern correlates precisely with V(D)J recombinase activity. RAG2 is expressed in immature lymphoid cells. While the amount of RAG1 is constant during the cell cycle, the RAG2 accumulates mainly in the G0 and G1 phases of the cell cycle and it undergoes rapid degradation when the cell enters the S phase. This serves as an important regulatory mechanism of V(D)J recombination and a prevention of genomic instability.

== Function ==
RAG2 is one of the two core components of the RAG complex. RAG complex is a multiprotein complex that mediates the DNA cleavage phase during V(D)J recombination. This complex can make double-strand breaks by cleaving DNA at conserved recombination signal sequences (RSS).

The other core component of this complex is RAG1. This protein is thought to possess most of the catalytic activity of the RAG complex. The RAG1 protein is the component that actually binds to DNA and cleaves it. Unlike RAG1, RAG2 protein does not appear to possess any endonuclease activity or to even bind to DNA strand. RAG2 plays a role of an accessory factor. Its primary function seems to be to interact with RAG1 protein and activate its endonuclease functions. RAG2 also enhances RSS recognition and thereby decreases nonspecific DNA binding by RAG complex. The N-terminal of the recombination activating gene 2 component is thought to form a six-bladed propeller in the active core that serves as a binding scaffold for the tight association of the complex with DNA. A C-terminal plant homeodomain finger-like motif in this protein is necessary for interactions with chromatin components, specifically with histone H3 that is trimethylated at lysine 4.

As recombination does not occur in the absence of RAG2, its interactions with RAG1 are thought to be crucial for catalytic function of RAG1 protein. Therefore, presence of both RAG1 and RAG2 is essential for the generation of mature B and T lymphocytes.

== Clinical significance ==
As mentioned, RAG2 is crucial for the maturation of B and T cells. Therefore, mutations of RAG2 gene can result in severe immune disorders such as SCID (Severe Combined Immunodeficiency) or Omenn syndrome. Omenn Syndrom is caused by a hypomorphic mutation of RAG2 gene, which leads to reduced but still present function of the RAG complex. Although patients do not have any circulating B cells, a small number of oligoclonal T cells is developed. Over fifty percent of RAG1 is conserved in humans. Therefore, functionally validating novel genetic findings is crucial for characterising human RAG deficiency. 71 RAG1 and 39 RAG2 variants have been functionally assayed. Variants that are most likely to occur and present as disease-causing have been predicted. Combined with pathogenicity prediction, this application guides research to test the effect of top candidate variants in preparation for novel disease cases.

== RAG2 knockout mice ==
In 1992, a RAG2 knockout mice strain was generated. Since then, it has become a widely used mouse model in immunological research. This mice strain has an inactivated RAG2 gene. Therefore homozygous mice are unable to initiate V(D)J rearrangement and consequently fail to generate mature T and B lymphocytes. As such RAG2 knockout mice represent a very valuable research tool used in transplantation experiments, vaccine development and hematopoiesis research. Also, the RAG2 mutation can be combined with other mutations in order to develop further models useful for basic immunology research. Furthermore, methylcholantrene can be used to develop tumors in RAG2 knockout mice.
