= Psectrotarsia rhodophora =

Scientific classification
- Kingdom: Animalia
- Phylum: Arthropoda
- Class: Insecta
- Order: Lepidoptera
- Superfamily: Noctuoidea
- Family: Noctuidae
- Genus: Psectrotarsia
- Species: P. rhodophora

Binomial name
- Psectrotarsia rhodophora (Hampson, 1910)

Synonyms
- Erythroecia rhodophora Hampson, 1910

Species of moth

Psectrotarsia rhodophora is a species of moth of the family Noctuidae. It is only known from Guatemala.

The length of the forewings is 13.0–17.5 mm. Adults have been recorded in October and November.
