= HHLA2 =

Human protein-coding gene

Identifiers
- Aliases: HHLA2, B7H7, B7-H7, B7-H5, B7y, HERV-H LTR-associating 2
- External IDs: OMIM: 604371; GeneCards: HHLA2

Gene location (Human)
Chr.	Chromosome 3 (human)
Band	3q13.13	Start	108,296,490 bp
Band	3q13.13	End	108,378,285 bp
RNA expression pattern
Bgee	Human / Mouse (ortholog); Top expressed in: rectum; mucosa of transverse colon; jejunal mucosa; mucosa of sigmoid colon; secondary oocyte; gallbladder; duodenum; mucosa of ileum; olfactory zone of nasal mucosa; testicle / n/a; More reference expression data
BioGPS	n/a
Gene ontology
Molecular function	protein binding; molecular function; signaling receptor binding
Cellular component	integral component of membrane; membrane; cellular component; external side of plasma membrane
Biological process	T cell costimulation; positive regulation of cytokine production; positive regulation of activated T cell proliferation; regulation of immune response; T cell receptor signaling pathway
Sources:Amigo / QuickGO
Orthologs
Databases	NCBI: entry; OMA: entry
Species	Human	Mouse
Entrez	11148	n/a
Ensembl	ENSG00000114455	n/a
UniProt	Q9UM44	n/a
RefSeq (mRNA)	NM_001282556; NM_001282557; NM_001282558; NM_001282559; NM_007072 NM_001370244	n/a
RefSeq (protein)	NP_001269485; NP_001269486; NP_001269487; NP_001269488; NP_009003 NP_001357173	n/a
Location (UCSC)	Chr 3: 108.3 – 108.38 Mb	n/a
PubMed search		n/a
- Wikidata
View/Edit Human

HHLA2 member of B7 family is a protein that in humans is encoded by the HHLA2 gene.

This gene encodes a protein ligand found on the surface of monocytes. The encoded protein is thought to regulate cell-mediated immunity by binding to a receptor on T lymphocytes and inhibiting the proliferation of these cells. Alternate splicing results in multiple transcript variants.
