= Junctional diversity =

DNA sequence variations introduced in recombination

Generation of junctional diversity through recombination illustrated between two gene segments: D (blue) and J (green). Sections highlighted in red show nucleotides added at each stage.

Junctional diversity describes the DNA sequence variations introduced by the improper joining of gene segments during the process of V(D)J recombination. This process of V(D)J recombination has vital roles for the vertebrate immune system, as it is able to generate a huge repertoire of different T-cell receptor (TCR) and immunoglobulin molecules required for pathogen antigen recognition by T-cells and B cells, respectively.

== Process ==
Junctional diversity includes the process of somatic recombination or V(D)J recombination, during which the different variable gene segments (those segments involved in antigen recognition) of TCRs and immunoglobulins are rearranged and unused segments removed. This introduces double-strand breaks between the required segments. These ends form hairpin loops and must be joined together to form a single strand (summarised in diagram, right). This joining is a very inaccurate process that results in the variable addition or subtraction of nucleotides and, thus, generates junctional diversity.

Generation of junctional diversity starts as the proteins, recombination activating gene-1 and -2 (RAG1 and RAG2), along with DNA repair proteins, such as Artemis, are responsible for single-stranded cleavage of the hairpin loops and addition of a series of palindromic, 'P' nucleotides. Subsequent to this, the enzyme, terminal deoxynucleotidyl transferase (TdT), adds further random 'N' nucleotides. The newly synthesised strands anneal to one another, but mismatches are common. Exonucleases remove these unpaired nucleotides and the gaps are filled by DNA synthesis and repair machinery. Exonucleases may also cause shortening of this junction, however this process is still poorly understood.

Junctional diversity is liable to cause frame-shift mutations and thus production of non-functional proteins. Therefore, there is considerable waste involved in this process.
