= Terminal deoxynucleotidyl transferase =

Mammalian protein found in Homo sapiens

TdT
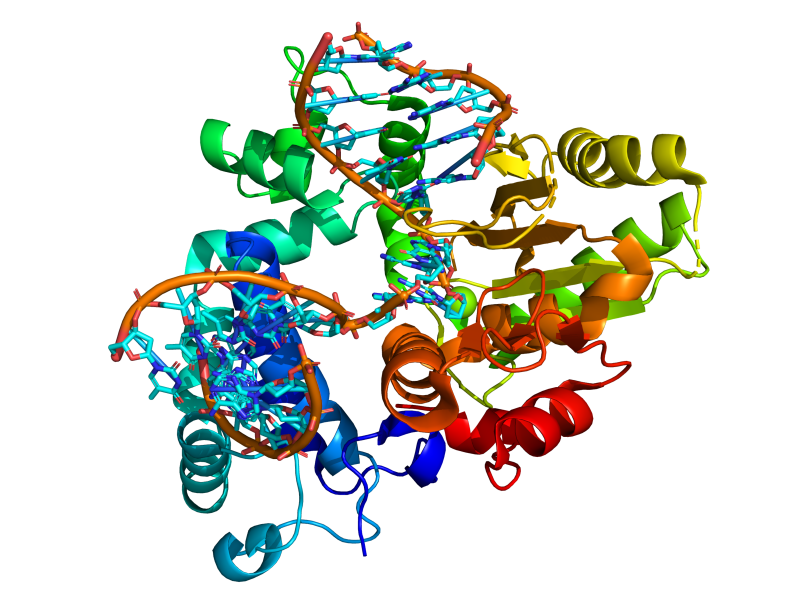

Identifiers
- Aliases: DNTT, TDT, DNA nucleotidylexotransferase, Terminal deoxynucleotidyl transferase
- External IDs: OMIM: 187410; MGI: 98659; GeneCards: DNTT
Available structures
PDB	Ortholog search: PDBe RCSB
PDB	List of PDB id codes 2COE, 4I27, 1KEJ, 1JMS
Enzyme activity
EC #	BRENDA	ExPASy	KEGG	MetaCyc
2.7.7.31	↗	↗	↗	↗

Gene location (Human)
Chr.	Chromosome 10 (human)
Band	10q24.1	Start	96,304,409 bp
Band	10q24.1	End	96,338,564 bp

Gene location (Mouse)
Chr.	Chromosome 19 (mouse)
Band	19 C3|19 34.32 cM	Start	41,017,714 bp
Band	19 C3|19 34.32 cM	End	41,047,964 bp
RNA expression pattern
Bgee	Human / Mouse (ortholog); Top expressed in: thymus; bone marrow; trabecular bone; bone marrow cell; testicle; human penis; synovial joint; amniotic fluid; pharynx; cecum / Top expressed in: thymus; ankle joint; granulocyte; tibiofemoral joint; bone marrow; embryo; sternocleidomastoid muscle; trachea; femur; body of femur; More reference expression data
BioGPS	n/a
Gene ontology
Molecular function	transferase activity; DNA binding; DNA-directed DNA polymerase activity; nucleotidyltransferase activity; protein binding; metal ion binding; DNA nucleotidylexotransferase activity; DNA polymerase; DNA polymerase activity
Cellular component	nucleus; nucleoplasm; euchromatin; nuclear matrix; cytoplasm; cytosol
Biological process	DNA metabolic process; DNA biosynthetic process; DNA modification; response to ATP; double-strand break repair via nonhomologous end joining
Sources:Amigo / QuickGO
Orthologs
Databases	NCBI: entry; OMA: entry
Species	Human	Mouse
Entrez	1791	21673
Ensembl	ENSG00000107447	ENSMUSG00000025014
UniProt	P04053	P09838
RefSeq (mRNA)	NM_001017520; NM_004088	NM_001043228; NM_009345
RefSeq (protein)	NP_001017520; NP_004079	NP_001036693; NP_033371
Location (UCSC)	Chr 10: 96.3 – 96.34 Mb	Chr 19: 41.02 – 41.05 Mb
PubMed search
- Wikidata
View/Edit Human	View/Edit Mouse

Terminal deoxynucleotidyl transferase (TdT), also known as DNA nucleotidylexotransferase (DNTT) or terminal transferase, is a specialized DNA polymerase expressed in immature, pre-B, pre-T lymphoid cells, and acute lymphoblastic leukemia/lymphoma cells. TdT adds N-nucleotides to the V, D, and J exons of the TCR and BCR genes during antibody gene recombination, enabling the phenomenon of junctional diversity. In humans, terminal transferase is encoded by the DNTT gene. As a member of the X family of DNA polymerase enzymes, it works in conjunction with polymerase λ and polymerase μ, both of which belong to the same X family of polymerase enzymes. The diversity introduced by TdT has played an important role in the evolution of the vertebrate immune system, significantly increasing the variety of antigen receptors that a cell is equipped with to fight pathogens. Studies using TdT knockout mice have found drastic reductions (10-fold) in T-cell receptor (TCR) diversity compared with that of normal, or wild-type, systems. The greater diversity of TCRs that an organism is equipped with leads to greater resistance to infection. Although TdT was one of the first DNA polymerases identified in mammals in 1960, it remains one of the least understood of all DNA polymerases. In 2016–18, TdT was discovered to demonstrate short patch DNA synthesis in an in trans template-dependent manner in addition to its more broadly known template-independent behaviour

TdT is absent in fetal liver HSCs, significantly impairing junctional diversity in B-cells during the fetal period.

== Function and regulation ==
Generally, TdT catalyses the addition of nucleotides to the 3' terminus of a DNA molecule. Unlike most DNA polymerases, it does not require a template. The preferred substrate of this enzyme is a 3'-overhang, but it can also add nucleotides to blunt or recessed 3' ends. Further, TdT is the only polymerase that is known to catalyze the synthesis of 2-15nt DNA polymers from free nucleotides in solution in vivo. In vitro, this behaviour catalyzes the general formation of DNA polymers without specific length. The 2-15 nt DNA fragments produced in vivo are hypothesized to act in signaling pathways related to DNA repair and/or recombination machinery. Like many polymerases, TdT requires a divalent cation cofactor, following the two-metal ion mechanism common to all polymerases. However, TdT is unique in its ability to use a broader range of cations such as Mg^{2+}, Mn^{2+}, Zn^{2+} and Co^{2+}. The rate of enzymatic activity depends on the available divalent cations and the nucleotide being added and the structural details of the catalytic cycle have been studied in detail for these different ions.

TdT is expressed mostly in the primary lymphoid organs, like the thymus and bone marrow. Regulation of its expression occurs via multiple pathways. These include protein-protein interactions, like those with TdIF1. TdIF1 is another protein that interacts with TdT to inhibit its function by masking the DNA binding region of the TdT polymerase. The regulation of TdT expression also exists at the transcriptional level, with regulation influenced by stage-specific factors, and occurs in a developmentally restrictive manner. Although expression is typically found to be in the primary lymphoid organs, recent work has suggested that stimulation via antigen can result in secondary TdT expression along with other enzymes needed for gene rearrangement outside of the thymus for T-cells. Patients with acute lymphoblastic leukemia greatly over-produce TdT. Cell lines derived from these patients served as one of the first sources of pure TdT and lead to the discovery that differences in activity exist between human and bovine isoforms.

=== Mechanism ===
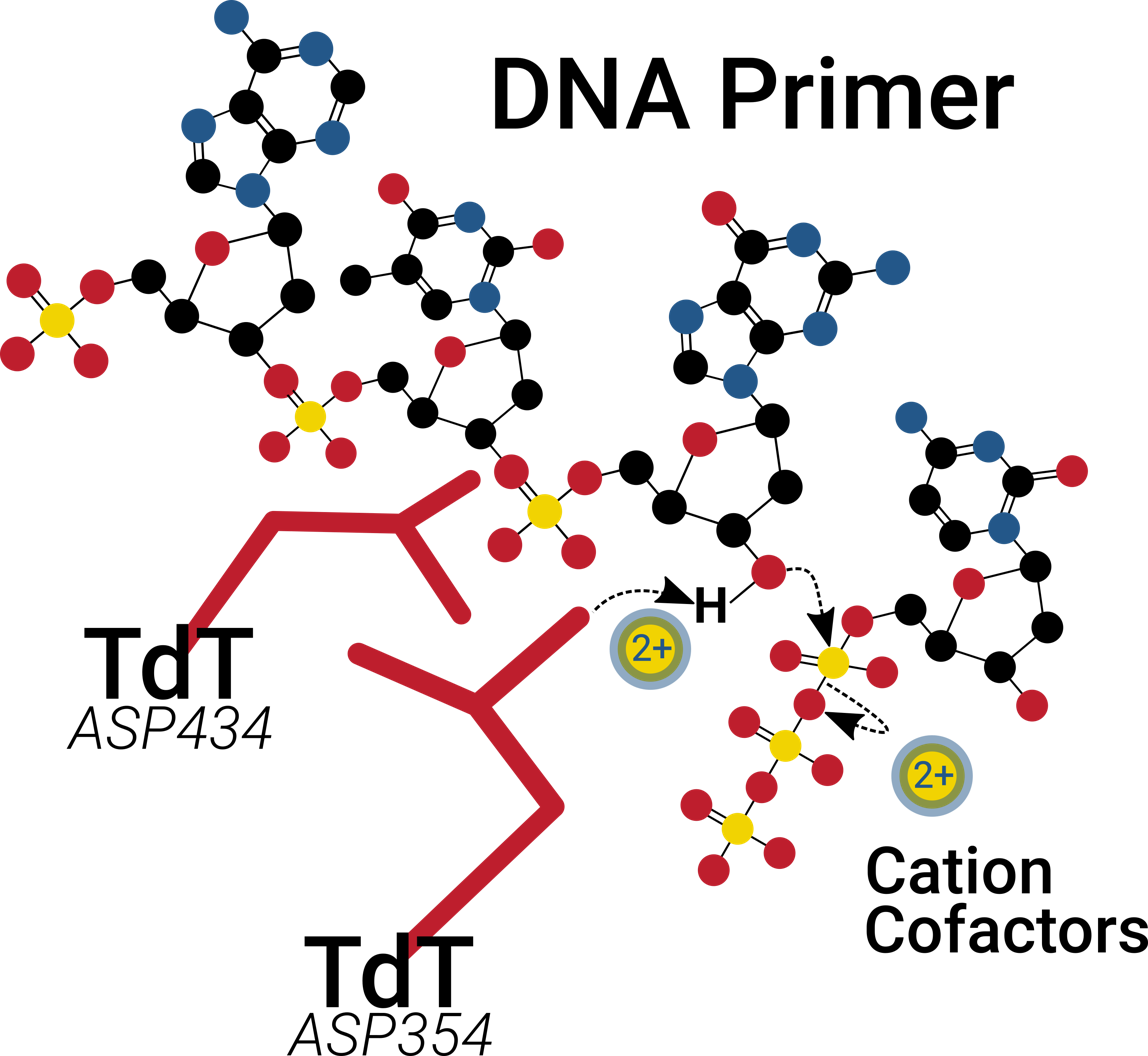
Graphic describing the mechanism of nucleotidyl condensation with ssDNA as catalyzed by terminal deoxynucleotidyl transferase with divalent cation cofactors. Two aspartate residues facilitate cation binding and nucleophilic attack.

Similar to many polymerases, the catalytic site of TdT has two divalent cations in its palm domain that assist in nucleotide binding, help lower the pK_{a} of the 3'-OH group and ultimately facilitate the departure of the resultant pyrophosphate by-product.

=== Isoform Variation ===
Several isoforms of TdT have been observed in mice, bovines, and humans. To date, two variants have been identified in mice while three have been identified in humans.

The two splice variants identified in mice are named according to their respective lengths: TdTS consists of 509 amino acids while TdTL, the longer variant, consists of 529 amino acids. The differences between TdTS and TdTL occur outside regions that bind DNA and nucleotides. That the 20 amino acid difference affects enzymatic activity is controversial, with some arguing that TdTL's modifications bestow exonuclease activity while others argue that TdTL and TdTS have nearly identical in vitro activity. Additionally, TdTL reportedly can modulate the catalytic activity of TdTS in vivo through an unknown mechanism. It is suggested that this aids in the regulation of TdT's role in V(D)J recombination.

Human TdT isoforms have three variants TdTL1, TdTL2, and TdTS. TdTL1 is broadly expressed in lymphoid cell lines while TdTL2 is predominantly expressed in normal small lymphocytes. Both localize in the nucleus when expressed and both possess 3'->5' exonuclease activity. In contrast, TdTS isoforms do not possess exonuclease activity and perform the necessary elongation during V(D)J recombination. Since a similar exonuclease activity hypothesized in murine TdTL is found in human and bovine TdTL, some postulate that bovine and human TdTL isoforms regulate TdTS isoforms in a similar manner as proposed in mice. Further, some hypothesize that TdTL1 may be involved in the regulation of TdTL2 and/or TdTS activity.

=== Role in V(D)J Recombination ===
This image provides a visual representation of how TdT works in the process of antibody gene rearrangement. Know that although the image uses D and J segments, the same type of rearrangements happen with other segment pairs as well.

Upon the action of the RAG 1/2 enzymes, the cleaved double-stranded DNA is left with hairpin structures at the end of each DNA segment created by the cleavage event. The hairpins are both opened by the Artemis complex, which has endonuclease activity when phosphorylated, providing the free 3' OH ends for TdT to act upon. Once the Artemis complex has done its job and added palindromic nucleotides (P-nucleotides) to the newly opened DNA hairpins, the stage is set for TdT to do its job. TdT is now able to come in and add N-nucleotides to the existing P-nucleotides in a 5' to 3' direction that polymerases are known to function. On average 2-5 random base pairs are added to each 3' end generated after the action of the Artemis complex. The number of bases added is enough for the two newly synthesized ssDNA segments to undergo microhomology alignment during non-homologous end joining according to the normal Watson-Crick base pairing patterns (A-T, C-G). From there unpaired nucleotides are excised by an exonuclease, like the Artemis Complex (which has exonuclease activity in addition to endonuclease activity), and then template-dependent polymerases can fill the gaps, finally creating the new coding joint with the action of ligase to combine the segments. Although TdT does not discriminate among the four base pairs when adding them to the N-nucleotide segments, it has shown a bias for guanine and cytosine base pairs.

=== Template Dependent Activity ===
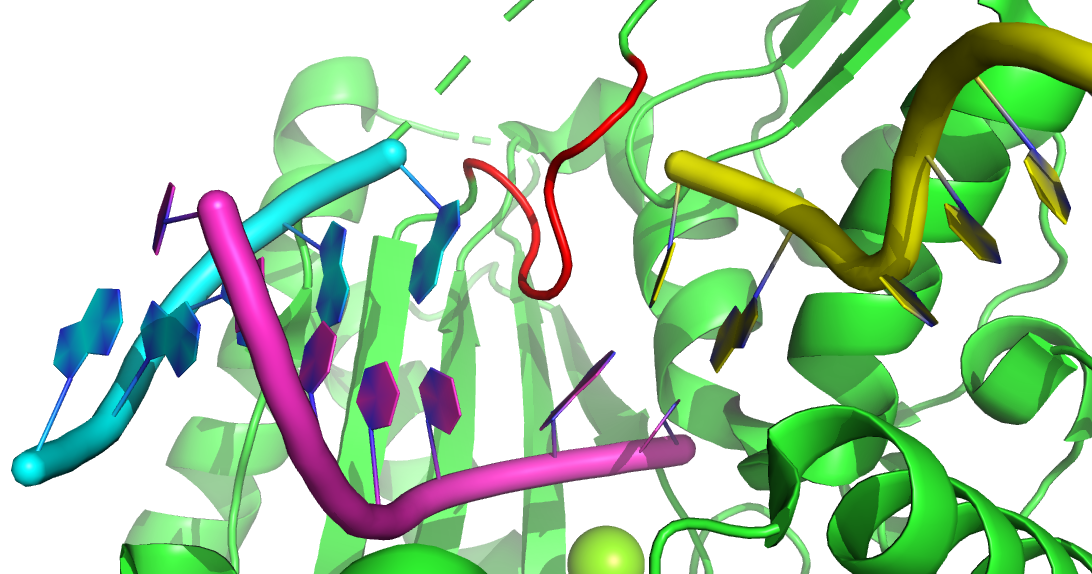
TdT bound to three DNA strands demonstrating the active configuration of its template dependent catalysis. Loop1 is highlighted in red.

In a template-dependent manner, TdT can incorporate just a few nucleotides across double-strand breaks in DNA in a manner referred to as in trans in contrast to the in cis mechanism found in most polymerases. This occurs optimally with a one base-pair break between strands and less so with an increasing gap. This is facilitated by a subsection of TdT called Loop1 which selectively probes for short breaks in double-stranded DNA. Further, the discovery of this template dependent activity has led to more convincing mechanistic hypotheses as to how the distribution of lengths of the additions of the N regions arise in V(D)J recombination.

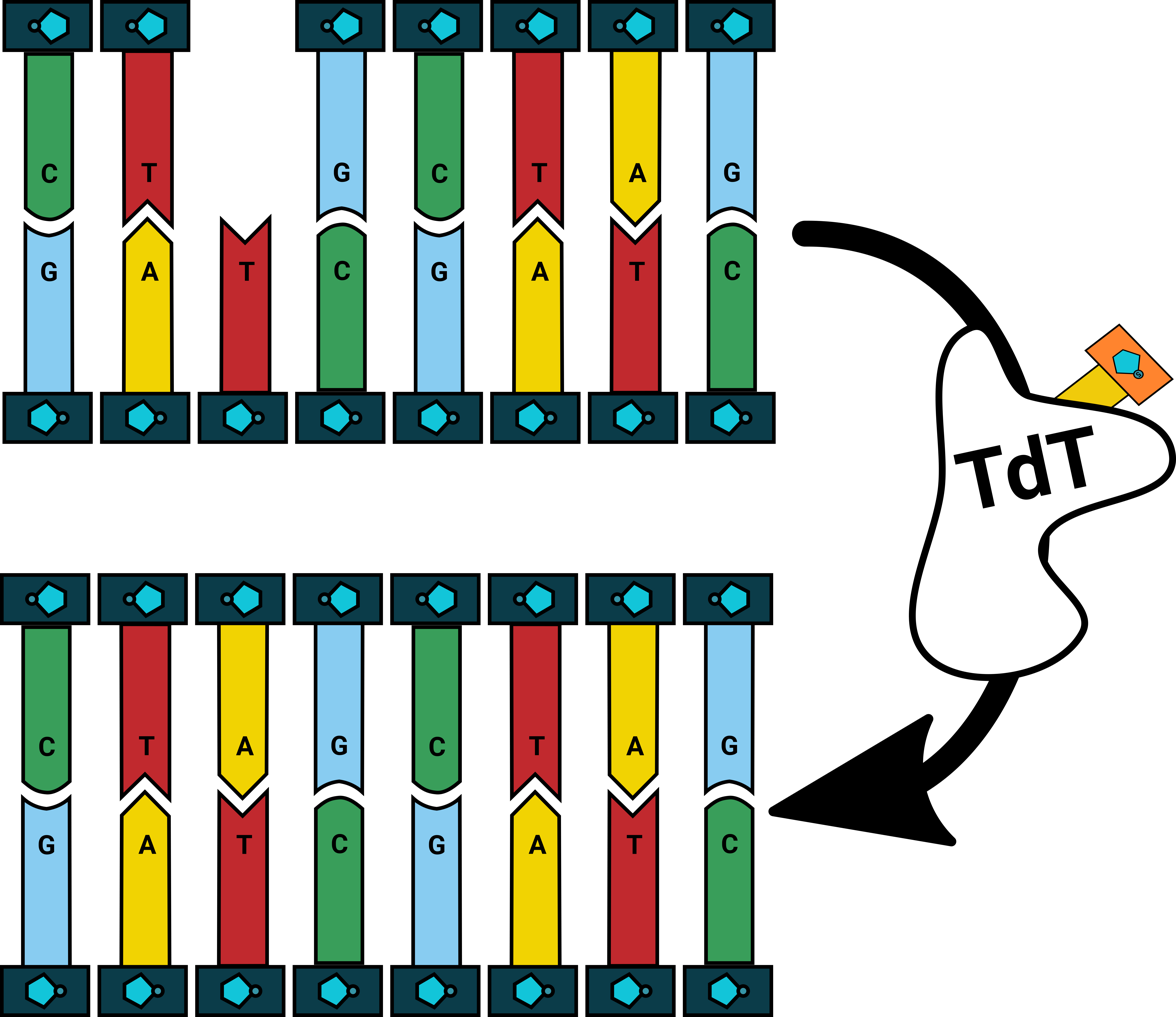
A graphical diagram depicting the in trans template dependent activity of terminal deoxynucleotidyl transferase.

Polymerase μ and polymerase λ exhibit similar in trans templated dependent synthetic activity to TdT, but without similar dependence on downstream double-stranded DNA. Further, Polymerase λ has also been found to exhibit similar template-independent synthetic activity. Along with activity as a terminal transferase, it is known to also work in a more general template-dependent fashion. The similarities between TdT and polymerase μ suggest they are closely evolutionarily related and a simple exchange of their Loop1 is sufficient to transform TdT into pol mu.

== Uses ==
Terminal transferase has applications in molecular biology. It can be used in RACE to add nucleotides that can then be used as a template for a primer in subsequent PCR. It can also be used to add nucleotides labeled with radioactive isotopes, for example in the TUNEL assay (Terminal deoxynucleotidyl transferase dUTP Nick End Labeling) for the demonstration of apoptosis (which is marked, in part, by fragmented DNA). It is also used in the immunofluorescence assay for the diagnosis of acute lymphoblastic leukemia.

In immunohistochemistry and flow cytometry, antibodies to TdT can be used to demonstrate the presence of immature T and B cells and pluripotent hematopoietic stem cells, which possess the antigen, while mature lymphoid cells are always TdT-negative. While TdT-positive cells are found in small numbers in healthy lymph nodes and tonsils, the malignant cells of acute lymphoblastic leukemia are also TdT-positive, and the antibody can, therefore, be used as part of a panel to diagnose this disease and to distinguish it from, for example, small cell tumors of childhood.

TdT has also seen recent application in the De Novo synthesis of oligonucleotides, with TdT-dNTP tethered analogs capable of primer extension by 1 nt at a time. In other words, the enzyme TdT has demonstrated the capability of making synthetic DNA by adding one letter at a time to a primer sequence.

== See also ==
- DNA
- DNA polymerase
