= IGKC =

Gene in the species Homo sapiens

Identifiers
- Aliases: IGKC, HCAK1, IGKCD, Km, immunoglobulin kappa constant
- External IDs: OMIM: 147200; GeneCards: IGKC

Gene location (Human)
Chr.	Chromosome 2 (human)
Band	2p11.2	Start	88,857,161 bp
Band	2p11.2	End	88,857,683 bp
RNA expression pattern
Bgee	Human / Mouse (ortholog); Top expressed in: rectum; cecum; appendix; mucosa of sigmoid colon; epithelium of nasopharynx; trachea; pylorus; spleen; duodenum; jejunal mucosa / n/a; More reference expression data
BioGPS	n/a
Orthologs
Databases	NCBI: entry; OMA: entry
Species	Human	Mouse
Entrez	3514	n/a
Ensembl	ENSG00000211592	n/a
UniProt	n a	n/a
RefSeq (mRNA)	n/a	n/a
RefSeq (protein)	n/a	n/a
Location (UCSC)	Chr 2: 88.86 – 88.86 Mb	n/a
PubMed search		n/a
- Wikidata
View/Edit Human

Immunoglobulin kappa constant, also known as IGKC, is a human gene that encodes the constant domain of kappa-type light chains for antibodies. It is found on chromosome 2, in humans, within the Immunoglobulin kappa locus, IGK@.
