= HLA-DQB2 =

Protein-coding gene in the species Homo sapiens

Identifiers
- Aliases: HLA-DQB2, HLA-DQB1, HLA-DXB, major histocompatibility complex, class II, DQ beta 2, DQB2
- External IDs: OMIM: 615161; GeneCards: HLA-DQB2

Gene location (Human)
Chr.	Chromosome 6 (human)
Band	6p21.32	Start	32,756,098 bp
Band	6p21.32	End	32,763,532 bp
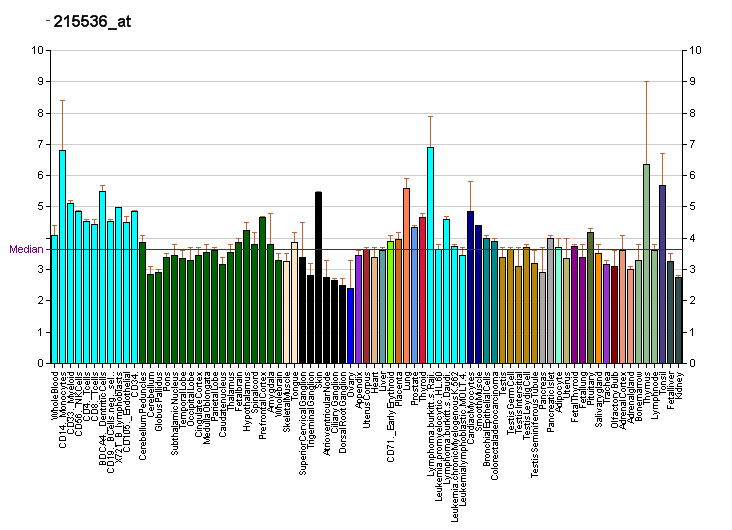
RNA expression pattern
Bgee	Human / Mouse (ortholog); Top expressed in: lymph node; granulocyte; skin of abdomen; skin of leg; appendix; upper lobe of left lung; monocyte; spleen; duodenum; right lung / n/a; More reference expression data
BioGPS	More reference expression data
Gene ontology
Molecular function	MHC class II receptor activity
Cellular component	integral component of membrane; endocytic vesicle membrane; clathrin-coated endocytic vesicle membrane; endosome; Golgi apparatus; trans-Golgi network membrane; endoplasmic reticulum membrane; membrane; Golgi membrane; plasma membrane; transport vesicle membrane; MHC class II protein complex; lysosomal membrane; endoplasmic reticulum; ER to Golgi transport vesicle membrane; lysosome; integral component of lumenal side of endoplasmic reticulum membrane; endosome membrane
Biological process	antigen processing and presentation; antigen processing and presentation of exogenous peptide antigen via MHC class II; interferon-gamma-mediated signaling pathway; immune system process; antigen processing and presentation of peptide or polysaccharide antigen via MHC class II; immune response; T cell receptor signaling pathway; adaptive immune response
Sources:Amigo / QuickGO
Orthologs
Databases	NCBI: entry; OMA: entry
Species	Human	Mouse
Entrez	3120	n/a
Ensembl	ENSG00000230675; ENSG00000196610; ENSG00000228254; ENSG00000232629; ENSG00000229493 ENSG00000228813; ENSG00000226165; ENSG00000224305	n/a
UniProt	P05538	n/a
RefSeq (mRNA)	NM_001198858; NM_001300790; NM_182549	n/a
RefSeq (protein)	NP_001185787; NP_001287719	n/a
Location (UCSC)	Chr 6: 32.76 – 32.76 Mb	n/a
PubMed search		n/a
- Wikidata
View/Edit Human

HLA class II histocompatibility antigen, DX beta chain is a protein that in humans is encoded by the HLA-DQB2 gene.
