= Psectrotarsia flava =

Scientific classification
- Domain: Eukaryota
- Kingdom: Animalia
- Phylum: Arthropoda
- Class: Insecta
- Order: Lepidoptera
- Superfamily: Noctuoidea
- Family: Noctuidae
- Genus: Psectrotarsia
- Species: P. flava

Binomial name
- Psectrotarsia flava Dognin, 1907

Species of moth

Psectrotarsia flava is a species of moth of the family Noctuidae. It is found in Peru, west of the Andes.

The length of the forewings is 12.9–13.3 mm.
