= Immunoglobulin heavy constant alpha 1 =

Gene in the species Homo sapiens

IGHA1

Identifiers
- Aliases: IGHA1, IgA1, Immunoglobulin heavy constant alpha 1
- External IDs: OMIM: 146900; GeneCards: IGHA1
Available structures
PDB	Human UniProt search: PDBe RCSB
PDB	List of PDB id codes 1IGA, 1OW0, 2QEJ

Gene location (Human)
Chr.	Chromosome 14 (human)
Band	14q32.33	Start	105,703,995 bp
Band	14q32.33	End	105,708,665 bp
RNA expression pattern
Bgee	Human / Mouse (ortholog); Top expressed in: duodenum; mucosa of transverse colon; spleen; rectum; appendix; olfactory zone of nasal mucosa; tonsil; bone marrow cell; gallbladder; lymph node / n/a; More reference expression data
BioGPS	n/a
Gene ontology
Molecular function	antigen binding; immunoglobulin receptor binding
Cellular component	secretory IgA immunoglobulin complex; blood microparticle; monomeric IgA immunoglobulin complex; secretory dimeric IgA immunoglobulin complex; extracellular exosome; external side of plasma membrane; extracellular space; extracellular region; plasma membrane; membrane; immunoglobulin complex, circulating; immunoglobulin complex
Biological process	B cell receptor signaling pathway; receptor-mediated endocytosis; phagocytosis, engulfment; retina homeostasis; glomerular filtration; immune response; complement activation, classical pathway; phagocytosis, recognition; positive regulation of B cell activation; innate immune response; positive regulation of respiratory burst; leukocyte migration; adaptive immune response; immune system process; defense response to bacterium
Sources:Amigo / QuickGO
Orthologs
Databases	NCBI: entry; OMA: entry
Species	Human	Mouse
Entrez	3493	n/a
Ensembl	ENSG00000211895	n/a
UniProt	P01876	n/a
RefSeq (mRNA)	n/a	n/a
RefSeq (protein)	n/a	n/a
Location (UCSC)	Chr 14: 105.7 – 105.71 Mb	n/a
PubMed search		n/a
- Wikidata
View/Edit Human

Immunoglobulin heavy constant alpha 1 is a immunoglobulin gene with symbol IGHA1. It encodes a constant (C) segment of Immunoglobulin A heavy chain. Immunoglobulin A is an antibody that plays a critical role in immune function in the mucous membranes. IgA shows the same typical structure of other antibody classes, with two heavy chains and two light chains, and four distinct domains: one variable region, and three variable regions. As a major class of immunoglobulin in body secretions, IgA plays a role in defending against infection, as well as preventing the access of foreign antigens to the immunologic system.

== Discovery ==
IGHA1 was first described in detail in 1975, when the primary structure (the amino acid sequence) of IgA was elucidated through the sequencing of tryptic and chymotryptic peptides. Similarly, the primary sequence was determined independently for the alpha-2 chain of the protein in 1979. Complete nucleotide sequences for the alpha-1 heavy chain constant region and the allelic alpha-2 heavy chain regions were published in 1984, and showed the genes were contained in three exons, each of which encodes a single region of the protein domain.

== Gene ==
The genes encoding IGHA1 are found on human chromosome 14. The sequence encoding IGHA1 is 1,497 nucleotides long and is found between loci 105,707,168 and 105,708,664. The annotated chromosome location is also given as 14q32.33.

== Structure ==
The Ig alpha-1 chain C region is contained on the first of the constant regions of IgA, and is composed of an amino acid sequence 353 residues long. The secondary structure contained within this region is dominated by beta strands, which define four antiparallel beta sheets. These antiparallel beta-sheets are then sandwiched to form two beta-sandwiches, a typical tertiary structure of the immunoglobulin fold class. The two beta sheets that comprise each beta-sandwich are joined by an alpha helix on one side. These alpha helices define the binding site for this protein, with the binding site incorporating one antiparallel beta strand on either side of the helix. In addition to the binding sites, the opposite side of the beta-sandwich is connected by a series of loops, which define a hypervariable loop system, that may have a role in determining the specificity of an interaction between IgA and an antigen.

== Function ==
The IGHA1 gene encodes the heavy-chain constant region that defines the IgA1 subclass, the antibody isotype responsible for the body's primary humoral defense at mucosal surfaces. Together with IgA2, it accounts for over half of all antibody produced in the body. This constant region promotes antigen-independent trapping of pathogens and toxins in the mucus so they can be cleared before invading the epithelium.

== Clinical significance ==
IGHA1 has been implicated in a chromosomal abnormality identified in multiple myeloma lines. The abnormality has been identified as a translocation event, where translocation between IGHA1 (found on chromosome 14), and FCRL4 (the gene sequence encoding for an inhibitory receptor, found on chromosome 1) leads to the production of a fusion protein.
