= RMRP =

Human gene

Identifiers
- Aliases: RMRP, CHH, NME1, RMRPR, RRP2, RNA component of mitochondrial RNA processing endoribonuclease
- External IDs: OMIM: 157660; GeneCards: RMRP

Gene location (Human)
Chr.	Chromosome 9 (human)
Band	9p13.3	Start	35,657,751 bp
Band	9p13.3	End	35,658,018 bp
RNA expression pattern
Bgee	Human / Mouse (ortholog); Top expressed in: epithelium of colon; bone marrow cell; sural nerve; tonsil; corpus callosum; Achilles tendon; skeletal muscle tissue; renal cortex; primary visual cortex; muscle of thigh / n/a; More reference expression data
BioGPS	n/a
Orthologs
Databases	NCBI: entry; OMA: entry
Species	Human	Mouse
Entrez	6023	n/a
Ensembl	ENSG00000269900	n/a
UniProt	n a	n/a
RefSeq (mRNA)	n/a	n/a
RefSeq (protein)	n/a	n/a
Location (UCSC)	Chr 9: 35.66 – 35.66 Mb	n/a
PubMed search		n/a
- Wikidata
View/Edit Human

RNA component of mitochondrial RNA processing endoribonuclease, also known as RMRP, is a human gene.

Mitochondrial RNA-processing endoribonuclease cleaves mitochondrial RNA complementary to the light chain of the displacement loop at a unique site (Chang and Clayton, 1987). The enzyme is a ribonucleoprotein whose RNA component is a nuclear gene product. The RNA component is the first RNA encoded by a single-copy gene in the nucleus and imported into mitochondria. The RMRP gene is untranslated, i.e., it encodes an RNA not a protein.[supplied by OMIM]

It is associated with cartilage–hair hypoplasia.
