= IGHA2 =

Gene in the species Homo sapiens

Identifiers
- Aliases: IGHA2, immunoglobulin heavy constant alpha 2 (A2m marker)
- External IDs: OMIM: 147000; GeneCards: IGHA2

Gene location (Human)
Chr.	Chromosome 14 (human)
Band	14q32.33	Start	105,583,731 bp
Band	14q32.33	End	105,588,395 bp
RNA expression pattern
Bgee	Human / Mouse (ortholog); Top expressed in: mucosa of transverse colon; duodenum; rectum; appendix; tonsil; olfactory zone of nasal mucosa; spleen; bone marrow cell; epithelium of colon; salivary gland / n/a; More reference expression data
BioGPS	n/a
Orthologs
Databases	NCBI: entry; OMA: entry
Species	Human	Mouse
Entrez	3494	n/a
Ensembl	ENSG00000211890	n/a
UniProt	n a	n/a
RefSeq (mRNA)	n/a	n/a
RefSeq (protein)	n/a	n/a
Location (UCSC)	Chr 14: 105.58 – 105.59 Mb	n/a
PubMed search		n/a
- Wikidata
View/Edit Human

Ig alpha-2 chain C region is a protein that in humans is encoded by the IGHA2 gene.
