= IGHD =

Gene in the species Homo sapiens

Identifiers
- Aliases: IGHD, immunoglobulin heavy constant delta
- External IDs: OMIM: 147170; MGI: 96447; GeneCards: IGHD

Gene location (Human)
Chr.	Chromosome 14 (human)
Band	14q32.33	Start	105,836,765 bp
Band	14q32.33	End	105,845,677 bp
RNA expression pattern
Bgee	Human / Mouse (ortholog); Top expressed in: lymph node; spleen; granulocyte; bone marrow cell; appendix; blood; olfactory zone of nasal mucosa; salivary gland; tonsil; minor salivary glands / n/a; More reference expression data
BioGPS	n/a
Orthologs
Databases	NCBI: entry; OMA: entry
Species	Human	Mouse
Entrez	3495	380797
Ensembl	ENSG00000211898	ENSMUSG00000104213
UniProt	n a	n/a
RefSeq (mRNA)	n/a	n/a
RefSeq (protein)	n/a	n/a
Location (UCSC)	Chr 14: 105.84 – 105.85 Mb	n/a
PubMed search
- Wikidata
View/Edit Human	View/Edit Mouse

Ig delta chain C region is a protein that in humans is encoded by the IGHD gene.
