= IGHG4 =

Gene in the species Homo sapiens

Identifiers
- Aliases: IGHG4, immunoglobulin heavy constant gamma 4 (G4m marker)
- External IDs: OMIM: 147130; GeneCards: IGHG4

Gene location (Human)
Chr.	Chromosome 14 (human)
Band	14q32.33	Start	105,620,506 bp
Band	14q32.33	End	105,626,066 bp
RNA expression pattern
Bgee	Human / Mouse (ortholog); Top expressed in: appendix; duodenum; spleen; gallbladder; bone marrow cell; mucosa of transverse colon; lymph node; rectum; right lobe of liver; right coronary artery / n/a; More reference expression data
BioGPS	n/a
Orthologs
Databases	NCBI: entry; OMA: entry
Species	Human	Mouse
Entrez	3503	n/a
Ensembl	ENSG00000211892	n/a
UniProt	n a	n/a
RefSeq (mRNA)	n/a	n/a
RefSeq (protein)	n/a	n/a
Location (UCSC)	Chr 14: 105.62 – 105.63 Mb	n/a
PubMed search		n/a
- Wikidata
View/Edit Human

Ig gamma-4 chain C region is a protein that in humans is encoded by the IGHG4 gene.

== See also ==
- Immunoglobulin heavy chain (IGH)
- Immunoglobulin G (IgG)
  - Subclasses of IgG, IgG4 is encoded by this gene
- IgG4-related disease
