= IGHM =

Gene in the species Homo sapiens

Identifiers
- Aliases: IGHM, AGM1, MU, VH, immunoglobulin heavy constant mu
- External IDs: OMIM: 147020; GeneCards: IGHM

Gene location (Human)
Chr.	Chromosome 14 (human)
Band	14q32.33	Start	105,851,705 bp
Band	14q32.33	End	105,856,218 bp
RNA expression pattern
Bgee	Human / Mouse (ortholog); Top expressed in: spleen; granulocyte; appendix; mucosa of transverse colon; rectum; bone marrow cell; lymph node; blood; tonsil; olfactory zone of nasal mucosa / n/a; More reference expression data
BioGPS	n/a
Orthologs
Databases	NCBI: entry; OMA: entry
Species	Human	Mouse
Entrez	3507	n/a
Ensembl	ENSG00000211899	n/a
UniProt	n a	n/a
RefSeq (mRNA)	n/a	n/a
RefSeq (protein)	n/a	n/a
Location (UCSC)	Chr 14: 105.85 – 105.86 Mb	n/a
PubMed search		n/a
- Wikidata
View/Edit Human

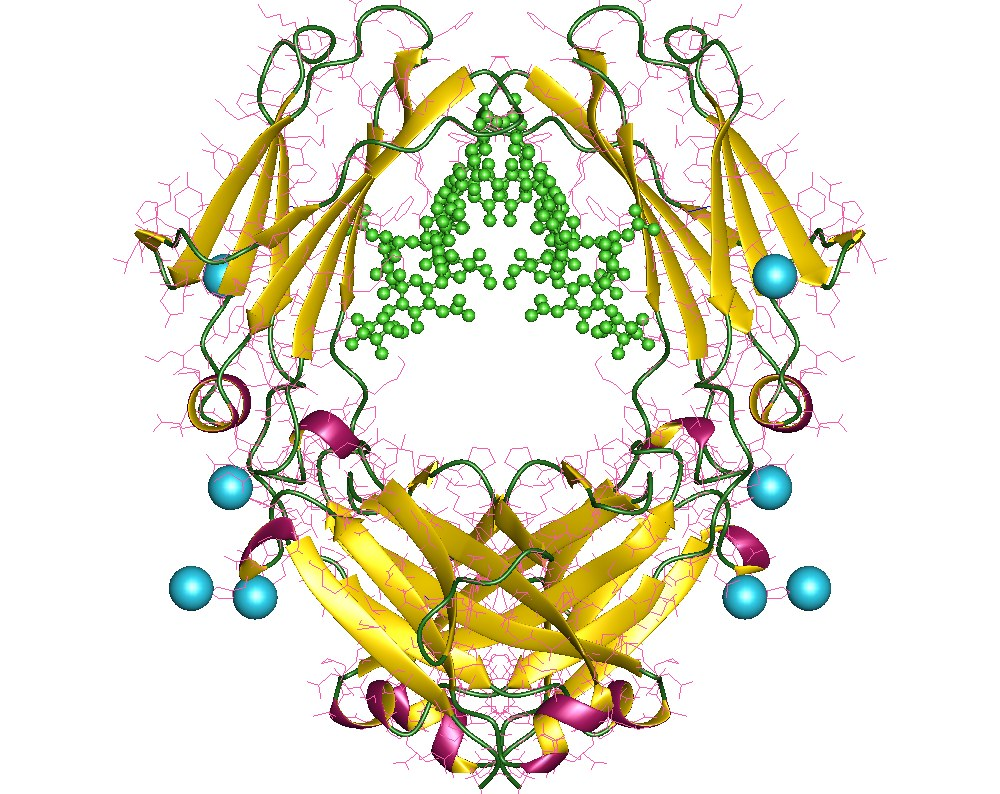
IGHM dimer, Human

Ig mu chain C region is a protein that in humans is encoded by the IGHM gene.

It is associated with agammaglobulinemia-1.
