= IGHG3 =

Gene in the species Homo sapiens

Identifiers
- Aliases: IGHG3, IgG3, immunoglobulin heavy constant gamma 3 (G3m marker)
- External IDs: OMIM: 147120; GeneCards: IGHG3

Gene location (Human)
Chr.	Chromosome 14 (human)
Band	14q32.33	Start	105,764,503 bp
Band	14q32.33	End	105,771,405 bp
RNA expression pattern
Bgee	Human / Mouse (ortholog); Top expressed in: lymph node; spleen; bone marrow cell; appendix; olfactory zone of nasal mucosa; upper lobe of left lung; tonsil; gallbladder; left uterine tube; right coronary artery / n/a; More reference expression data
BioGPS	n/a
Orthologs
Databases	NCBI: entry; OMA: entry
Species	Human	Mouse
Entrez	3502	n/a
Ensembl	ENSG00000211897	n/a
UniProt	n a	n/a
RefSeq (mRNA)	n/a	n/a
RefSeq (protein)	n/a	n/a
Location (UCSC)	Chr 14: 105.76 – 105.77 Mb	n/a
PubMed search		n/a
- Wikidata
View/Edit Human

Ig gamma-3 chain C region is a protein that in humans is encoded by the IGHG3 gene.
