= IGHG1 =

Gene in the species Homo sapiens

Identifiers
- Aliases: IGHG1, immunoglobulin heavy constant gamma 1 (G1m marker)
- External IDs: OMIM: 147100; GeneCards: IGHG1

Gene location (Human)
Chr.	Chromosome 14 (human)
Band	14q32.33	Start	105,736,343 bp
Band	14q32.33	End	105,743,071 bp
RNA expression pattern
Bgee	Human / Mouse (ortholog); Top expressed in: spleen; lymph node; appendix; bone marrow cell; gallbladder; olfactory zone of nasal mucosa; duodenum; right coronary artery; rectum; upper lobe of left lung / n/a; More reference expression data
BioGPS	n/a
Orthologs
Databases	NCBI: entry; OMA: entry
Species	Human	Mouse
Entrez	3500	n/a
Ensembl	ENSG00000211896	n/a
UniProt	n a	n/a
RefSeq (mRNA)	n/a	n/a
RefSeq (protein)	n/a	n/a
Location (UCSC)	Chr 14: 105.74 – 105.74 Mb	n/a
PubMed search		n/a
- Wikidata
View/Edit Human

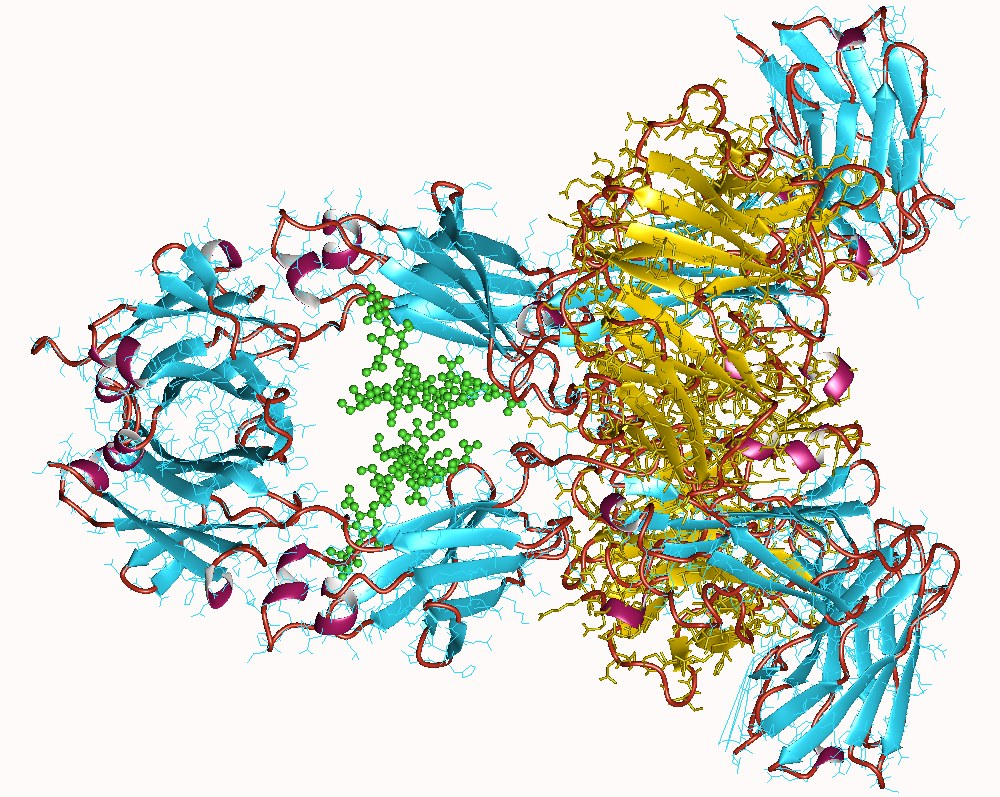
IgG1 B12 heterotetramer, Human.

Ig gamma-1 chain C region is a protein that in humans is encoded by the IGHG1 gene.
