= Immunoglobulin light chain =

Small antibody polypeptide subunit (immunoglobin)

Schematic diagram of a typical antibody showing two Ig heavy chains (blue) linked by disulfide bonds to two Ig light chains (green). The constant (C) and variable (V) domains are shown.

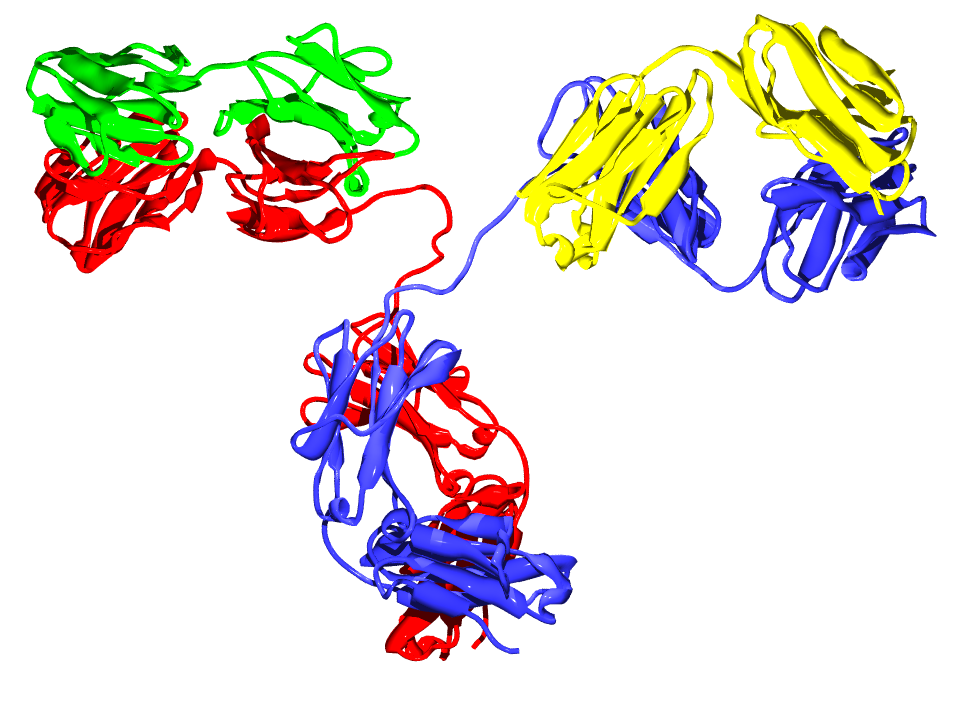
An antibody molecule. The two heavy chains are colored red, blue, and purple. The two light chains green and yellow. See also:

The immunoglobulin light chain is the small polypeptide subunit of an antibody (immunoglobulin).

A typical antibody is composed of two immunoglobulin (Ig) heavy chains and two Ig light chains.

== In humans ==
There are two types of light chain in humans:

- kappa (κ) chain, encoded by the immunoglobulin kappa locus (IGK@) on chromosome 2 (locus: 2p11.2)
- lambda (λ) chain, encoded by the immunoglobulin lambda locus (IGL@) on chromosome 22 (locus: 22q11.2)

Antibodies are produced by B lymphocytes, each expressing only one class of light chain. Once set, light chain class remains fixed for the life of the B lymphocyte. In a healthy individual, the total kappa-to-lambda ratio is roughly 2:1 in serum (measuring intact whole antibodies) or 1:1.5 if measuring free light chains, with a highly divergent ratio indicative of neoplasm. The free light chain ratio ranges from 0.26 to 1.65. Both the kappa and the lambda chains can increase proportionately, maintaining a normal ratio. This is usually indicative of something other than a blood cell dyscrasia, such as kidney disease.

There is also a surrogate light chain IGLL1 (λ5) with a role in B cell development, a mammalian invention.

== In other animals ==
The immunoglobulin light chain genes in tetrapods can be classified into three distinct groups: kappa (κ), lambda (λ), and sigma (σ). The divergence of the κ, λ, and σ isotypes preceded the radiation of tetrapods (more sensitive studies date this division back to the origin of bony vertebrates).

- Kappa is found in all major lineages of tetrapods except the birds.
- Lambda is found in all major lineages of tetrapods.
- Sigma is only found in amphibians, so it was lost in the common ancestor of non-amphibian tetrapods, the amniotes.

Other types of light chains can be found in more distantly-related vertebrates, such as the iota (ι) chain of Chondrichthyes and Teleostei. Cartilaginous fish has a fourth type, sigma-2, also found in coelacanths: this makes is possibly as ancient as the division into the three other types.

Camelids are unique among mammals as they also have fully functional antibodies which have two heavy chains, but lack the light chains usually paired with each heavy chain.

Sharks also possess, as part of their adaptive immune systems, a functional heavy-chain homodimeric antibody-like molecule referred to as IgNAR (immunoglobulin new antigen receptor). IgNAR is believed to have never had an associated light chain, in contrast with the understanding that the heavy-chain-only antibodies in camelids may have lost their light chain partners through evolution.

== Structure ==
Only one type of light chain is present in a typical antibody, thus the two light chains of an individual antibody are identical.

Each light chain is composed of two tandem immunoglobulin domains:

- one constant (C_{L}) domain
- one variable domain (V_{L}) that is important for binding antigen

The approximate length of a light chain protein is from 211 to 217 amino acids. The constant region determines what class (kappa or lambda) the light chain is. The lambda class has 4 subtypes ($\lambda$_{1}, $\lambda$_{2}, $\lambda$_{3}, and $\lambda$_{7}). These subtypes are encoded by the genes IGLC1, IGLC2, IGLC3, and IGLC7; IGLC4-6 are pseudogenes and are therefore not expressed in humans. The kappa class only has one subtype, encoded by the IGKC gene.

== In pathology ==
Kappa (κ, left) and lambda (λ, right) on immunohistochemistry in normal tonsil control tissue. Both positive-cell populations are present, with an approximate κ:λ ratio of 2:1 in the displayed fields.

B cells and their plasma cell descendants generally express either kappa (κ) or lambda (λ) immunoglobulin light chains. Reactive lymphoid tissues usually contain a mixture of cells expressing each type, described as a polytypic population. The relative proportions vary with the tissue and cell population; a polytypic population need not contain equal numbers of kappa-positive and lambda-positive cells.

Light-chain expression can be assessed using immunohistochemistry, in situ hybridization or flow cytometry. Immunohistochemistry is effective for evaluating plasma cells, which contain abundant cytoplasmic immunoglobulin, but may be insufficiently sensitive for B lymphocytes with lower light-chain expression. Marked predominance of one light-chain type within the population being assessed, termed light-chain restriction, supports a clonal population and can contribute to the diagnosis of B-cell lymphoma or a plasma-cell neoplasm. Interpretation also requires tissue morphology, other immunophenotypic findings and clinical context. Failure to demonstrate restriction does not exclude lymphoma, particularly when neoplastic cells express little detectable light chain or are obscured by reactive cells.

Monoclonal free light chains produced by plasma-cell disorders such as multiple myeloma may be excreted in urine, where they are known as Bence Jones proteins. Monoclonal light chains can also cause kidney injury through cast formation or tissue deposition, including the formation of amyloid fibrils in AL amyloidosis.

Polyclonal increases in free light chains occur in various inflammatory and autoimmune diseases and can reflect increased immune activity. Circulating concentrations are also influenced by renal clearance. Experimental studies have reported free-light-chain-mediated mast cell activation and hypersensitivity responses in mice, antigen-specific responses in mouse dorsal root ganglion neurons, and interactions with neutrophils in studies of chronic obstructive pulmonary disease. These findings have prompted investigation of possible roles for free light chains in inflammatory disease mechanisms.

== See also ==
- Monoclonal antibody
- Immunoglobulin heavy chain
