= IGHG2 =

Gene in the species Homo sapiens

Identifiers
- Aliases: IGHG2, immunoglobulin heavy constant gamma 2 (G2m marker)
- External IDs: OMIM: 147110; GeneCards: IGHG2

Gene location (Human)
Chr.	Chromosome 14 (human)
Band	14q32.33	Start	105,639,559 bp
Band	14q32.33	End	105,644,790 bp
RNA expression pattern
Bgee	Human / Mouse (ortholog); Top expressed in: appendix; spleen; bone marrow cell; rectum; lymph node; duodenum; right coronary artery; mucosa of transverse colon; olfactory zone of nasal mucosa; gallbladder / n/a; More reference expression data
BioGPS	n/a
Orthologs
Databases	NCBI: entry; OMA: entry
Species	Human	Mouse
Entrez	3501	n/a
Ensembl	ENSG00000211893	n/a
UniProt	n a	n/a
RefSeq (mRNA)	n/a	n/a
RefSeq (protein)	n/a	n/a
Location (UCSC)	Chr 14: 105.64 – 105.64 Mb	n/a
PubMed search		n/a
- Wikidata
View/Edit Human

Ig gamma-2 chain C region is a protein that in humans is encoded by the IGHG2 gene.
