= Recombination signal sequences =

Sequences of noncoding DNA

Recombination signal sequences are conserved sequences of noncoding DNA that are recognized by the RAG1/RAG2 enzyme complex during V(D)J recombination in immature B cells and T cells. Recombination signal sequences guide the enzyme complex to the V, D, and J gene segments that will undergo recombination during the formation of the heavy and light-chain variable regions in T-cell receptors and immunoglobulin molecules.

== Structure ==
RSSs are made up of highly conserved heptamer sequences (7 base pairs), spacer sequences, and conserved nonamer sequences (9 base pairs) that are adjacent to the V, D and J sequences in the heavy-chain region of DNA and the V and J sequences in the light-chain DNA region. Spacer sequences are located between heptamer and nonamer sequences and exhibit base pair variety but are always either 12 base pairs or 23 base pairs long. Heptamer sequences are usually CACAGTG and nonamers are usually ACAAAAACC. The nucleotides in bold are more highly conserved. The RAG1/RAG2 enzyme complex follows the 12-23 rule when joining V, D, and J segments, pairing 12-bp spacer RSSs to 23-bp spacer RSSs. This prevents two different genes coding for the same region from recombining (ex. V-V recombination). RSSs are located between V, D, and J segments of the germ-line DNA of maturing B and T lymphocytes and are permanently spliced out of the final Ig mRNA product after V(D)J recombination is complete.

== Function ==
The RAG1/RAG2 enzyme complex recognizes the heptamer sequences flanking the V and J coding regions and nicks their 5' end, releasing the intervening DNA between the V and J coding regions.

The RAG1/RAG2 enzyme complex recognizes the heptamer sequences flanking the V and J coding regions and nicks their 5' end, releasing the intervening DNA between the V and J coding regions. In the heavy-chain coding region of DNA, the RAG1/RAG2 enzyme complex recognizes the RSSs flanking the D and J segments and brings them together, forming a loop containing intervening DNA. The RAG1/RAG2 complex then introduces a nick at the 5' end of the RSS heptamers adjacent to the coding regions on both the D and J segments, permanently removing the loop of intervening DNA and creating a double-stranded break that is repaired by VDJ recombinase enzymes. This process is repeated for the joining of V to DJ. In light-chain rearrangement, only V and J segments are brought together.

== Related Diseases & Disorders ==
=== cRSS ===
Cryptic RSSs are gene sequences that resemble authentic RSSs and are occasionally mistaken for them by the RAG1/RAG2 enzyme complex. Recombining an RSS with a cRSS can lead to chromosome translocations, which can lead to cancer.

=== Omenn's Syndrome ===
Some infants born with autosomal recessive SCIDS lack a functional copies of the genes that code for the RAG1/RAG2 enzyme complex because of missense mutations. These infants will produce a non-functional RAG1/RAG2 enzyme complex that cannot recognize RSSs and therefore cannot initiate V(D)J recombination effectively. This disorder is characterized by a lack of functioning B and T cells.
