= RIDDLE syndrome =

- Other names: Radiosensitivity-immunodeficiency-dysmorphic features-learning difficulties syndrome
- Riddle syndrome is inherited in an autosomal recessive pattern.

RIDDLE syndrome is a rare genetic syndrome. The name is an acronym for Radiosensitivity, ImmunoDeficiency Dysmorphic features and Learning difficulties.

== Presentation ==
The features of this condition include:

- Facial dysmorphism
- Short stature
- Mild motor control and learning difficulties
- Mild ataxia
- Microcephaly
- Normal intelligence
- Conjunctival telangiectasia
- Recurrent sinus infections
- Decreased serum IgA
- Late onset of pulmonary fibrosis
- Increased alpha-fetoprotein
- Increased radiosensitivity

== Genetics ==
This condition is due to mutations in the RNF168 gene. It is inherited in an autosomal recessive fashion. The gene encodes a ubiquitin ligase and is located on the long arm of chromosome 3 (3q29) on the Crick (minus strand).

== Diagnosis ==
=== Differential diagnosis ===
The DDx is

- Ataxia telangectasia
- Artemis deficiency
- Immunodeficiency 26 (PKCS gene deficiency)
- LIG4 syndrome
- Nijmegen breakage syndrome
- Severe combined immunodeficiency with Cernunnos
- X-linked agammaglobulinemia

== Epidemiology ==
This condition is extremely rare. Only four cases have been described up to 2017.

== History ==
This syndrome was first described by Stewart et al. 2007.
