= XLF =

XLF may refer to:

- XLF (protein), XRCC4-like factor
- .xlf, the filename extension for XLIFF
- ICAO code for XL Airways France
