= DNA repair protein XRCC4 =

Protein found in humans

XRCC4
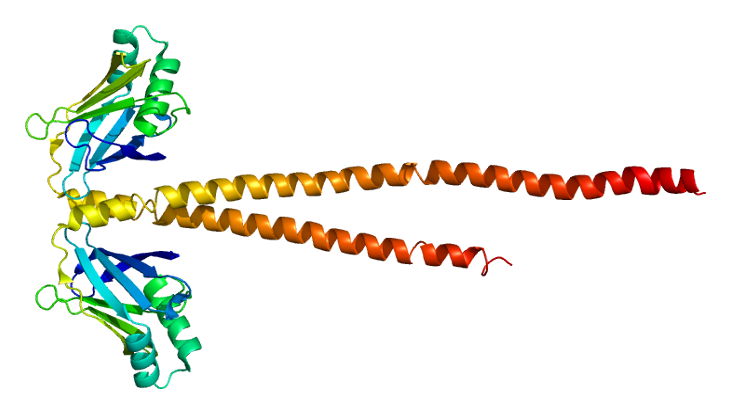

Identifiers
- Aliases: XRCC4, SSMED, X-ray repair complementing defective repair in Chinese hamster cells 4, X-ray repair cross complementing 4, hXRCC4
- External IDs: OMIM: 194363; MGI: 1333799; GeneCards: XRCC4
Available structures
PDB	Ortholog search: PDBe RCSB
PDB	List of PDB id codes 1FU1, 1IK9, 3II6, 3MUD, 3Q4F, 3RWR, 3SR2, 3W03, 4XA4, 5CHX, 5CJ0, 5CJ4, 5E50

Gene location (Human)
Chr.	Chromosome 5 (human)
Band	5q14.2	Start	83,077,498 bp
Band	5q14.2	End	83,353,787 bp

Gene location (Mouse)
Chr.	Chromosome 13 (mouse)
Band	13|13 C3	Start	89,922,146 bp
Band	13|13 C3	End	90,237,727 bp
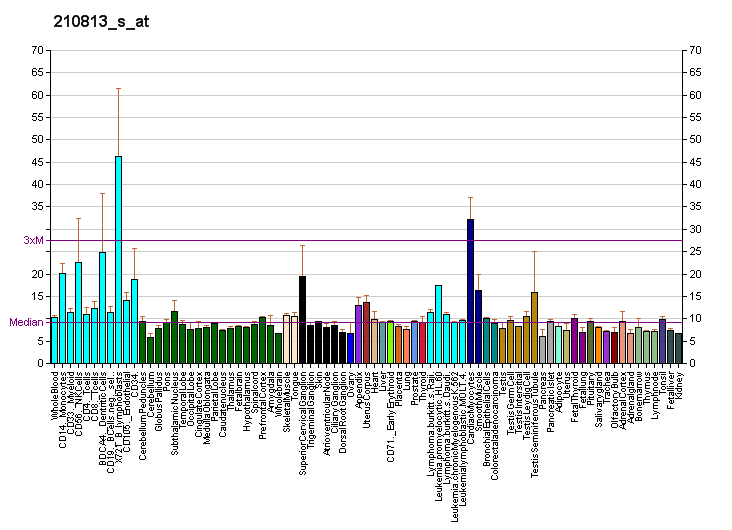

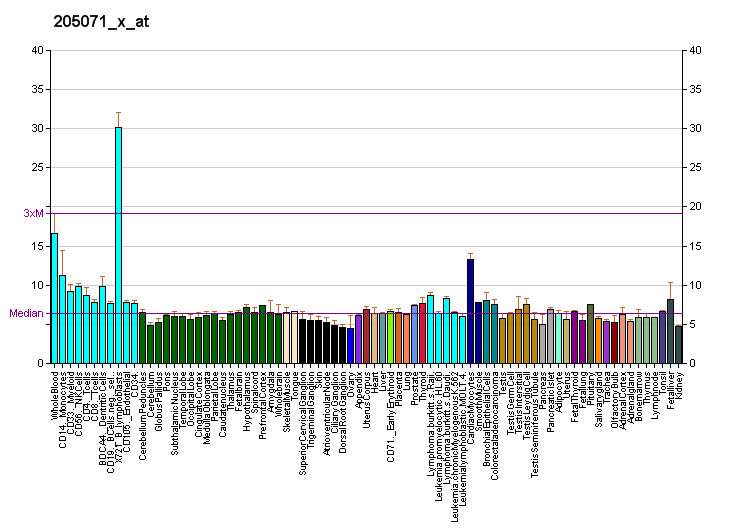

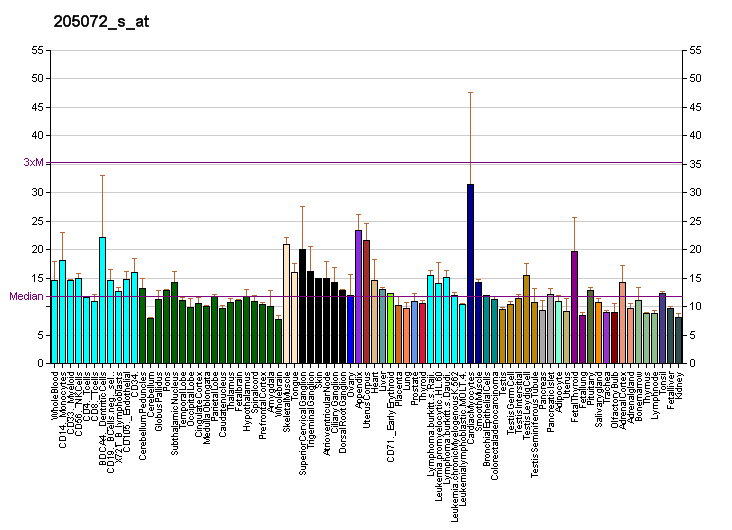
RNA expression pattern
Bgee	Human / Mouse (ortholog); Top expressed in: testicle; monocyte; gonad; secondary oocyte; ventricular zone; Descending thoracic aorta; Achilles tendon; ganglionic eminence; islet of Langerhans; ascending aorta / Top expressed in: spermatocyte; spermatid; seminiferous tubule; zygote; secondary oocyte; pineal gland; Epithelium of choroid plexus; primary oocyte; olfactory epithelium; granulocyte; More reference expression data
BioGPS	More reference expression data
Gene ontology
Molecular function	DNA binding; ligase activity; protein C-terminus binding; protein binding; identical protein binding
Cellular component	cytosol; nucleoplasm; DNA-dependent protein kinase-DNA ligase 4 complex; DNA ligase IV complex; nonhomologous end joining complex; condensed chromosome; nucleus
Biological process	DNA recombination; cellular response to lithium ion; cellular response to DNA damage stimulus; establishment of integrated proviral latency; DNA ligation involved in DNA repair; positive regulation of ligase activity; double-strand break repair via nonhomologous end joining; response to X-ray; double-strand break repair; DNA repair
Sources:Amigo / QuickGO
Orthologs
Databases	NCBI: entry; OMA: entry
Species	Human	Mouse
Entrez	7518	108138
Ensembl	ENSG00000152422	ENSMUSG00000021615
UniProt	Q13426	Q924T3
RefSeq (mRNA)	NM_003401; NM_022406; NM_022550; NM_001318012; NM_001318013	NM_028012
RefSeq (protein)	NP_001304941; NP_001304942; NP_003392; NP_071801; NP_072044 NP_071801.1; NP_001304941.1; NP_001304942.1	NP_082288
Location (UCSC)	Chr 5: 83.08 – 83.35 Mb	Chr 13: 89.92 – 90.24 Mb
PubMed search
- Wikidata
View/Edit Human	View/Edit Mouse

DNA repair protein XRCC4 (hXRCC4) also known as X-ray repair cross-complementing protein 4 is a protein that in humans is encoded by the XRCC4 gene. XRCC4 is also expressed in many other animals, fungi and plants. hXRCC4 is one of several core proteins involved in the non-homologous end joining (NHEJ) pathway to repair DNA double strand breaks (DSBs).

NHEJ requires two main components to achieve successful completion. The first component is the cooperative binding and phosphorylation of artemis by the catalytic subunit of the DNA-dependent protein kinase (DNA-PKcs). Artemis cleaves the ends of damaged DNA to prepare it for ligation. The second component involves the bridging of DNA to DNA ligase 4, by hXRCC4, with the aid of Cernunnos-XLF. DNA-PKcs and hXRCC4 are anchored to Ku70 / Ku80 heterodimer, which are bound to the DNA ends.

Since hXRCC4 is the key protein that enables interaction of DNA ligase 4 to damaged DNA and therefore ligation of the ends, mutations in the XRCC4 gene were found to cause embryonic lethality in mice and developmental inhibition and immunodeficiency in humans. Furthermore, certain mutations in XRCC4 are associated with an increased risk of cancer.

== Double strand breaks ==
Double strand breaks (DSBs) are mainly caused by free radicals generated from ionizing radiation in the environment and from by-products released continually during cellular metabolism. DSBs that are not efficiently repaired may result in the loss of important protein coding genes and regulatory sequences required for gene expression necessary for the life of a cell. DSBs that cannot rely on a newly copied sister chromosome generated by DNA replication to fill in the gap will go into the NHEJ pathway. This method of repair is essential as it is a last resort to prevent loss of long stretches of the chromosome. NHEJ is also used to repair DSBs generated during V(D)J recombination when gene regions are rearranged to create the unique antigen binding sites of antibodies and T-cell receptors.

=== Sources of DNA damage ===
DNA damage occurs very frequently and is generated from exposure to a variety of both exogenous and endogenous genotoxic sources. One of these include ionizing radiation, such as gamma radiation and X-rays, which ionize the deoxyribose groups in the DNA backbone and can induce DSBs. Reactive oxygen species (ROS), such as superoxide (O_{2}^{– •}), hydrogen peroxide (H_{2}O_{2}), hydroxyl radicals (HO^{•}), and singlet oxygen (^{1}O_{2}), can also produce DSBs as a result of ionizing radiation as well as cellular metabolic processes that are naturally occurring. DSBs can also be caused by the action of DNA polymerase while attempting to replicate DNA over a nick that was introduced as a result of DNA damage.

=== Consequences of DSBs ===
There are many types of DNA damage, but DSBs, in particular, are the most harmful as both strands are completely disjointed from the rest of the chromosome. If an efficient repair mechanism does not exist, the ends of the DNA can eventually degrade, leading to a permanent loss of sequence. A double-stranded gap in DNA will also prevent replication from proceeding, resulting in an incomplete copy of that specific chromosome, targeting the cell for apoptosis. As with all DNA damage, DSBs can introduce new mutations that can ultimately lead to cancer.

=== DSB repair methods ===
There are two methods for repairing DSBs depending on when the damage occurs during mitosis. If the DSB occurs after DNA replication has completed proceeding S phase of the cell cycle, the DSB repair pathway will use homologous recombination by pairing with the newly synthesized daughter strand to repair the break. However, if the DSB is generated prior to synthesis of the sister chromosome, then the template sequence that is required will be absent. For this circumstance, the NHEJ pathway provides a solution for repairing the break and is the main system used to repair DSBs in humans and multicellular eukaryotes. During NHEJ, very short stretches of complementary DNA, one base pair or more at a time, are hybridized together, and the overhangs are removed. As a result, this specific region of the genome is permanently lost and the deletion can lead to cancer and premature aging.

== Properties ==
=== Gene and protein ===
XRCC4 is located on chromosome 5, specifically at 5q14.2. This gene contains eight exons and three mRNA transcript variants, which encode two different protein isoforms. Transcript variant 1, mRNA, RefSeq NM_003401.3, is 1688 bp long and is the shortest out of the three variants. It is missing a short sequence in the 3' coding region as compared to variant 2. Isoform 1 contains 334 amino acids. Transcript variant 2, mRNA, RefSeq NM_022406, is 1694 bp long and encodes the longest isoform 2, which contains 336 amino acids. Transcript variant 3, RefSeq NM_022550.2, is 1735 bp and is the longest, but it also encodes for the same isoform 1 as variant 1. It contains an additional sequence in the 5'UTR of the mRNA transcript and lacks a short sequence in the 3'coding region as compared to variant 2.

=== Structure ===
XRCC4

Identifiers
- Symbol: XRCC4
- Pfam: PF06632
- InterPro: IPR010585
- SCOP2: 1fu1 / SCOPe / SUPFAM
Available protein structures:
- PDB: IPR010585 PF06632 (ECOD; PDBsum)
- AlphaFold: IPR010585; PF06632

hXRCC4 is a tetramer that resembles the shape of a dumbbell containing two globular ends separated by a long, thin stalk. The tetramer is composed of two dimers, and each dimer is made up of two similar subunits. The first subunit (L) contains amino acid residues 1–203 and has a longer stalk than the second subunit (S) which contains residues 1–178.

The globular N-terminal domains of each subunit are identical. They are made up of two, antiparallel beta sheets that face each other in a beta sandwich-like structure (i.e., a "flattened" beta barrel) and are separated by two alpha helices on one side. The N-terminus begins with one beta sheet composed of strands 1, 2, 3, and 4, followed by a helix-turn-helix motif of the two alpha helices, αA and αB, which continues into strands 5, 6, 7, and ending with one alpha-helical stalk at the C-terminus. αA and αB are perpendicular to one another, and because one end of αB is partially inserted between the two beta sheets, it causes them to flare out away from each other. The beta sandwich structure is held together through three hydrogen bonds between antiparallel strands 4 and 7 and one hydrogen bond between strands 1 and 5.

The two helical stalks between subunits L and S intertwine with a single left-handed crossover into a coiled-coil at the top, near the globular domains forming a palm tree configuration. This region interacts with the two alpha helices of the second dimer in an opposite orientation to form a four-helix bundle and the dumbbell-shaped tetramer.

=== Post-translational modifications ===
In order for hXRCC4 to be sequestered from the cytoplasm to the nucleus to repair a DSB during NHEJ or to complete V(D)J recombination, post-translational modification at lysine 210 with a small ubiquitin-related modifier (SUMO), or sumoylation, is required. SUMO modification of diverse types of DNA repair proteins can be found in topoisomerases, base excision glycosylase TDG, Ku70/80, and BLM helicase. A common conserved motif is typically found to be a target of SUMO modification, ΨKXE (where Ψ is a bulky, hydrophobic amino acid). In the case of the XRCC4 protein, the consensus sequence surrounding lysine 210 is IKQE. Chinese hamster ovary cells, CHO, that express the mutated form of XRCC4 at K210 cannot be modified with SUMO, fail recruitment to the nucleus and instead accumulate in the cytoplasm. Furthermore, these cells are radiation sensitive and do not successfully complete V(D)J recombination.

=== Interactions ===
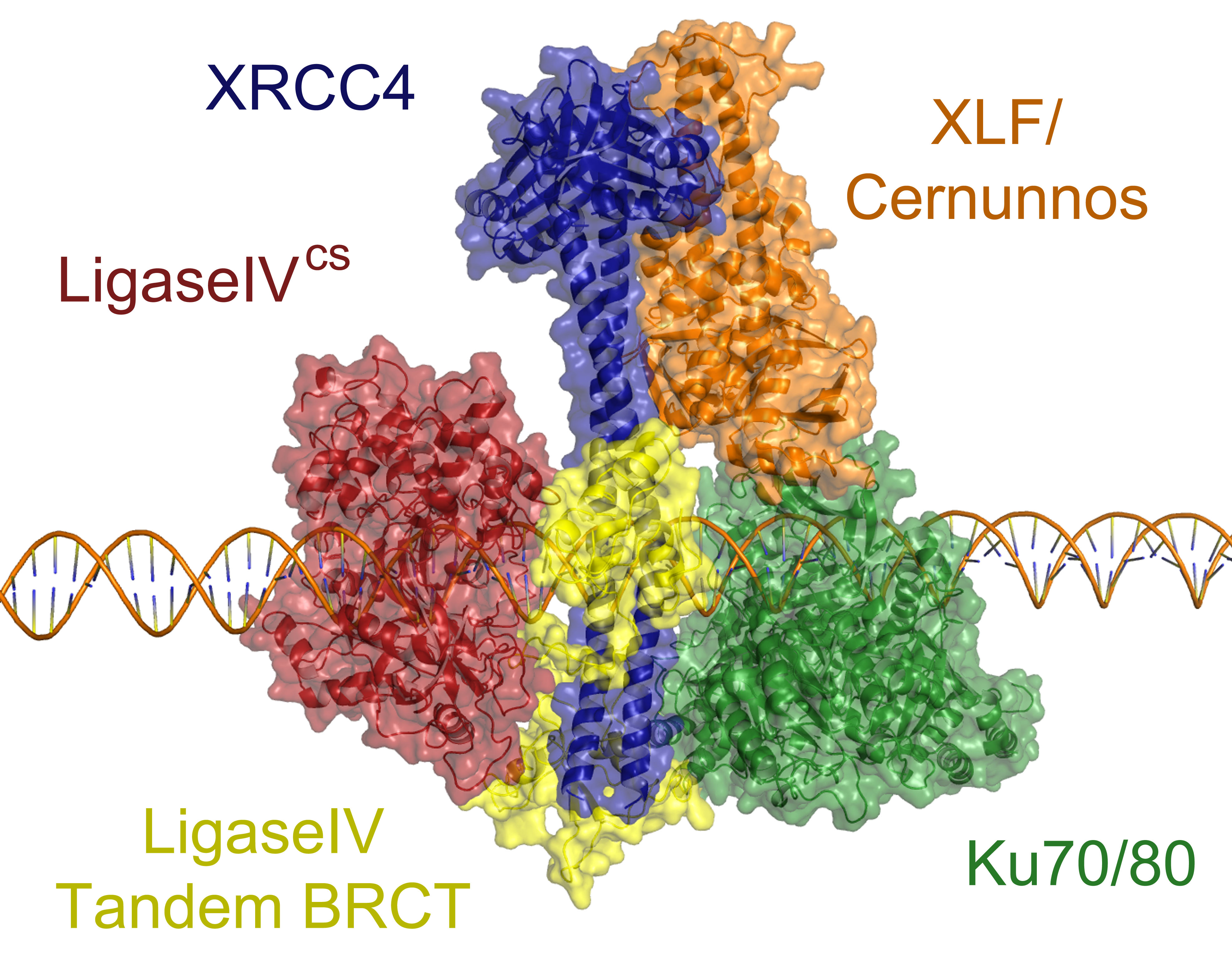
Interaction of XRCC4 with other components of the NHEJ complex

Upon generation of a DSB, Ku proteins will move through the cytoplasm until they find the site of the break and bind to it. Ku recruits XRCC4 and Cer-XLF and both of these proteins interact cooperatively with one another through specific residues to form a nucleoprotein pore complex that wraps around DNA. Cer-XLF is a homodimer that is very similar to XRCC4 in the structure and size of its N-terminal and C-terminal domains. Residues arginine 64, leucine 65, and leucine 115 in Cer-XLF interact with lysines 65 and 99 in XRCC4 within their N-terminal domains. Together they form a filament bundle that wraps around DNA in an alternating pattern. Hyper-phosphorylation of the C-terminal alpha helical domains of XRCC4 by DNA-PKcs facilitates this interaction. XRCC4 dimer binds to a second dimer on an adjacent DNA strand to create a tetramer for DNA bridging early on in NHEJ. Prior to ligation, Lig IV binds to the C-terminal stalk of XRCC4 at the site of the break and displaces the second XRCC4 dimer. The BRCT2 domain of Lig IV hydrogen bonds with XRCC4 at this domain through multiple residues and introduces a kink in the two alpha helical tails. The helix-loop-helix clamp connected to the BRCT-linker also makes extensive contacts.

== Mechanism ==
=== NHEJ ===
The process of NHEJ involves XRCC4 and a number of tightly coupled proteins acting in concert to repair the DSB. The system begins with the binding of one heterodimeric protein called Ku70/80 to each end of the DSB to maintain them close together in preparation for ligation and prevent their degradation. Ku70/80 then sequesters one DNA-dependent protein kinase catalytic subunit (DNA-PKcs) to the DNA ends to enable the binding of Artemis protein to one end of each DNA-PKcs. One end of the DNA-PKcs joins to stabilize the proximity of the DSB and allow very short regions of DNA complementarity to hybridize. DNA-PKcs then phosphorylates Artemis at a serine/threonine to activate its exonuclease activity and cleave nucleotides at the single strand tails that are not hybridized in a 5' to 3' direction. Two XRCC4 proteins are post-translationally modified for recognition and localization to Ku70/80 (5). The two XRCC4 proteins dimerize together and bind to Ku70/80 at the ends of the DNA strands to promote ligation. XRCC4 then forms a strong complex with DNA ligase IV, LigIV, which is enhanced by Cernunnos XRCC4-like factor, Cer-XLF. Cer-XLF only binds to XRCC4 without direct interaction with LigIV. LigIV then joins the DNA ends by catalyzing a covalent phosphodiester bond.

=== V(D)J recombination ===
V(D)J recombination is the rearrangement of multiple, distinct gene segments in germ-line DNA to produce the unique protein domains of immune cells, B cells and T cells, that will specifically recognize foreign antigens such as viruses, bacteria, and pathogenic eukaryotes. B cells produce antibodies that are secreted into the bloodstream and T cells produce receptors that once translated are transported to the outer lipid bilayer of the cell. Antibodies are composed of two light and two heavy chains. The antigen binding site consists of two variable regions, VL and VH. The remainder of the antibody structure is made up of constant regions, CL, CH, CH2 and CH3. The Kappa locus in the mouse encodes an antibody light chain and contains approximately 300 gene segments for the variable region, V, four J segments than encode a short protein region, and one constant, C, segment. To produce a light chain with one unique type of VL, when B cells are differentiating, DNA is rearranged to incorporate a unique combination of the V and J segments. RNA splicing joins the recombined region with the C segment. The heavy chain gene also contain numerous diversity segments, D, and multiple constant segments, Cμ, Cδ, Cγ, Cε, Cα. Recombination occurs in a specific region of the gene that is located between two conserved sequence motifs called recombination signal sequences. Each motif is flanked by a 7 bp and 9 bp sequence that is separated by a 12 bp spacer, referred to as class 1, or a 23 bp spacer, referred to as class 2. A recombinase made up of RAG1 and RAG2 subunits always cleave between these two sites. The cleavage results in two hairpin structures for the V and J segments, respectively, and the non-coding region, are now separated from the V and J segments by a DSB. The hairpin coding region goes through the process of NHEJ where the closed end is cleaved and repaired. The non-coding region is circularized and degraded. Thus, NHEJ is also important in the development of the immune system via its role in V(D)J recombination.

== Pathology ==
Recent studies have shown an association between XRCC4 and potential susceptibility to a variety of pathologies. The most frequently observed linkage is between XRCC4 mutations and susceptibility to cancers such as bladder cancer, breast cancer, and lymphomas. Studies have also pointed to a potential linkage between XRCC4 mutation and endometriosis. Autoimmunity is also being studied in this regard. Linkage between XRCC4 mutations and certain pathologies may provide a basis for diagnostic biomarkers and, eventually, potential development of new therapeutics.

=== Cancer susceptibility ===
XRCC4 polymorphisms have been linked to a risk of susceptibility for cancers such as bladder cancer, breast cancer, prostate cancer, hepatocellular carcinoma, lymphomas, and multiple myeloma. With respect to bladder cancer, for example, the link between XRCC4 and risk of cancer susceptibility was based on hospital-based case-control histological studies of gene variants of both XRCC4 and XRCC3 and their possible association with risk for urothelial bladder cancer. The linkage with risk for urothelial bladder cancer susceptibility was shown for XRCC4, but not for XRCC3 With regard to breast cancer, the linkage with "increased risk of breast cancer" was based on an examination of functional polymorphisms of the XRCC4 gene carried out in connection with a meta-analysis of five case-control studies . There is also at least one hospital-based case-control histological study indicating that polymorphisms in XRCC4 may have an "influence" on prostate cancer susceptibility. Conditional (CD21-cre-mediated) deletion of the XRCC4 NHEJ gene in p53-deficient peripheral mouse B cells resulted in surface Ig-negative B-cell lymphomas, and these lymphomas often had a "reciprocal chromosomal translocation" fusing IgH to Myc (and also had "large chromosomal deletions or translocations" involving IgK or IgL, with IgL "fusing" to oncogenes or to IgH). XRCC4- and p53-deficient pro-B lymphomas "routinely activate c-myc by gene amplification"; and furthermore, XRCC4- and p53-deficient peripheral B-cell lymphomas "routinely ectopically activate" a single copy of c-myc. Indeed, in view of the observation by some that "DNA repair enzymes are correctives for DNA damage induced by carcinogens and anticancer drugs", it should not be surprising that "SNPs in DNA repair genes may play an important part" in cancer susceptibility. In addition to the cancers identified above, XRCC4 polymorphisms have been identified as having a potential link to various additional cancers such as oral cancer, lung cancer, gastric cancer, and gliomas.

=== Senescence ===
Declining ability to repair DNA double-strand breaks by NHEJ may be a significant factor in the aging process. Li et al. found that, in humans, the efficiency of NHEJ repair declines from age 16 to 75 years. Their study indicated that decreased expression of XRCC4 and other NHEJ proteins drives an age-associated decline in NHEJ efficiency and fidelity. They suggested that the age related decline in expression of XRCC4 may contribute to cellular senescence.

=== Autoimmunity ===
Based on the findings that (1) several polypeptides in the NHEJ pathway are "potential targets of autoantibodies" and (2) "one of the autoimmune epitopes in XRCC4 coincides with a sequence that is a nexus for radiation-induced regulatory events", it has been suggested that exposure to DNA double-strand break-introducing agents "may be one of the factors" mediating autoimmune responses.

=== Endometriosis susceptibility ===
There has been speculation that "XRCC4 codon 247*A and XRCC4 promoter -1394*T related genotypes and alleles... might be associated with higher endometriosis susceptibilities and pathogenesis".

=== Potential use as a cancer biomarker ===
In view of the possible associations of XRCC4 polymorphisms with risk of cancer susceptibility (see discussion above), XRCC4 could be used as a biomarker for cancer screening, particularly with respect to prostate cancer, breast cancer, and bladder cancer. In fact, XRCC4 polymorphisms were specifically identified as having the potential to be novel useful markers for "primary prevention and anticancer intervention" in the case of urothelial bladder cancer.

=== Radiosensitization of tumor cells ===
In view of the role of XRCC4 in DNA double-strand break repair, the relationship between impaired XRCC4 function and the radiosensitization of tumor cells has been investigated. For instance, it has been reported that "RNAi-mediated targeting of noncoding and coding sequences in DNA repair gene messages efficiently radiosensitizes human tumor cells".

=== Potential role in therapeutics ===
There has been discussion in the literature concerning the potential role of XRCC4 in the development of novel therapeutics. For instance, Wu et al. have suggested that since the XRCC4 gene is "critical in NHEJ" and is "positively associated with cancer susceptibility", some XRCC4 SNPs such as G-1394T (rs6869366) "may serve as a common SNP for detecting and predict[ing] various cancers (so far for breast, gastric and prostate cancers...)"; and, although further investigation is needed, "they may serve as candidate targets for personalized anticancer drugs". The possibility of detecting endometriosis on this basis has also been mentioned, and this may also possibly lead to the eventual development of treatments. In evaluating further possibilities for anticancer treatments, Wu et al. also commented on the importance of "co-treatments of DNA-damaging agents and radiation". Specifically, Wu et al. noted that the "balance between DNA damage and capacity of DNA repair mechanisms determines the final therapeutic outcome" and "the capacity of cancer cells to complete DNA repair mechanisms is important for therapeutic resistance and has a negative impact upon therapeutic efficacy", and thus theorized that "[p]harmacological inhibition of recently detected targets of DNA repair with several small-molecule compounds... has the potential to enhance the cytotoxicity of anticancer agents".

=== Microcephalic primordial dwarfism ===
In humans, mutations in the XRCC4 gene cause microcephalic primordial dwarfism, a phenotype characterized by marked microcephaly, facial dysmorphism, developmental delay and short stature. Although immunoglobulin junctional diversity is impaired, these individuals do not show a recognizable immunological phenotype. In contrast to individuals with a LIG4 mutation, pancytopenia resulting in bone marrow failure is not observed in individuals with XRCC4 deficiency. At the cellular level, disruption of XRCC4 induces hypersensitivity to agents that induce double-strand breaks, defective double-strand break repair and increased apoptosis after induction of DNA damage.

== Anti-XRCC4 antibodies ==
Anti-XRCC4 antibodies including phosphospecific antibodies to pS260 and pS318 in XRCC4 have been developed. Antibodies to XRCC4 can have a variety of uses, including use in immunoassays to conduct research in areas such as DNA damage and repair, non-homologous end joining, transcription factors, epigenetics and nuclear signaling.

== History ==
Research carried out in the 1980s revealed that a Chinese hamster ovary (CHO) cell mutant called XR-1 was "extremely sensitive" with regard to being killed by gamma rays during the G1 portion of the cell cycle but, in the same research studies, showed "nearly normal resistance" to gamma-ray damage during the late S phase; and in the course of this research, XR-1's cell-cycle sensitivity was correlated with its inability to repair DNA double-strand breaks produced by ionizing radiation and restriction enzymes. In particular, in a study using somatic cell hybrids of XR-1 cells and human fibroblasts, Giaccia et al. (1989) showed that the XR-1 mutation was a recessive mutation; and in follow-up to this work, Giaccia et al. (1990) carried out further studies examining the XR-1 mutation (again using somatic cell hybrids formed between XR-1 and human fibroblasts) and were able to map the human complementing gene to chromosome 5 using chromosome-segregation analysis. Giaccia et al, tentatively assigned this human gene the name "XRCC4" (an abbreviation of "X-ray-complementing Chinese hamster gene 4") and determined that (a) the newly named XRCC4 gene biochemically restored the hamster defect to normal levels of resistance to gamma-ray radiation and bleomycin and (b) the XRCC4 gene restored the proficiency to repair DNA DSBs. Based on these findings, Giaccia et al. proposed that XRCC4―as a single gene―was responsible for the XR-1 phenotype.
