= SPACDR =

Human gene

Identifiers
- Aliases: SPACDR, chromosome 7 open reading frame 61, sperm acrosome developmental regulator, C7orf61
- External IDs: HomoloGene: 52845; GeneCards: SPACDR; OMA:SPACDR - orthologs

Gene location (Human)
Chr.	Chromosome 7 (human)
Band	7q22.1	Start	100,456,620 bp
Band	7q22.1	End	100,464,260 bp
RNA expression pattern
Bgee	Human / Mouse (ortholog); Top expressed in: left testis; right testis; testicle; C1 segment; sperm; tibial nerve; caudate nucleus; amygdala; hypothalamus; putamen / n/a; More reference expression data
BioGPS	n/a
Orthologs
Species	Human	Mouse
Entrez	402573	n/a
Ensembl	ENSG00000185955	n/a
UniProt	Q8IZ16	n/a
RefSeq (mRNA)	NM_001004323	n/a
RefSeq (protein)	NP_001004323	n/a
Location (UCSC)	Chr 7: 100.46 – 100.46 Mb	n/a
PubMed search		n/a
- Wikidata
View/Edit Human

Sperm acrosome developmental regulator, also known as C7orf61, is an asparagine-poor protein which in humans encoded by the SPACDR gene. The protein function is relatively unknown and is highly conserved in mammals.

== Gene ==
=== Locus ===
C7orf61 is located on the reverse (or negative) DNA strand and is situated in chromosome 7 (7q22.1) from base pairs 100,456,615-100,464,271 - roughly 7,656 bp. It has a total of 3 exons and lacks isoforms.

=== mRNA ===
The mRNA is approximately 1019 bp and belongs to domain of unknown function 4703 (PFAM15775).

=== Protein ===
In humans, the protein contains a total of 206 amino acids. The protein's molecular weight is 23.71 kDa and its isoelectric point is 10.41. DUF4703 is positioned 22-206aa of the protein. Neither the gene or its protein has another known alias, but can be found with high affinity in several primate species.

=== Composition ===
The amino acid composition of C7orf61 consists of high frequencies in leucine, serine, and charged valine. The protein has an unusual low frequency in asparagine, making it an asparagine-deficient protein, and contains higher frequencies of salt-bridge formations between glutamic acid, aspartic acid, lysine, and arginine.

=== Characteristics and structure ===
The consent within secondary structure prediction tools CFSSP, SSPRED, and GOR4 is that the protein's secondary structure consist mainly of α-helices (51.2%), with significant amounts of coiling (38.2%) and smaller fragments of beta strands (10.3%).

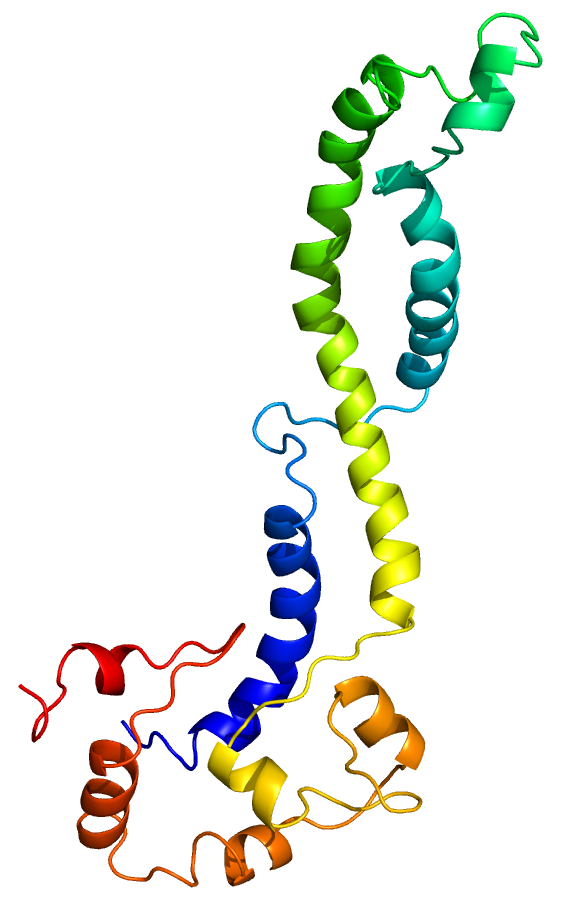
Predicted 3D structure of C7orf61 protein via PHYRE2.

=== Post-translational modifications ===
C7orf61 has several post-translation modification sites, most of which involve serine/threonine kinases - protein kinase C, Casein kinase II, DNA-dependent protein kinase, and Cyclin-dependent kinase 1. It is predicted to contain a Biparte nuclear localization signal (NLS_BP), a leucine-rich variant domain (LRV), and bacterial Ig-like domain (BIG-1).

=== Subcellular localization ===
C7orf61 does not contain any trans-membrane domains or signal peptides. The protein is predicted to be localized in the Mitochondria, with little indication of extracellular activity. Expanded analysis of amino acid sequence KFFRWVRRAWQRIISWVF near the N-terminal suggests the presence of a mitochondrial targeting signal.

== Gene regulation ==
C7orf61 has high levels of expression in the testis and lower levels in the brain and connective tissues. Through the assessment of microarray experiments available on NCBI Geo, its inferred that c7orf61 is under negative regulation.

== Homology ==
C7orf61 does not have any paralogs. Analysis via NCBI tool BLASTt found the gene to be highly conserved in mammals and could not be traced farther back than 160 MYA. The following table contains a list of orthologs found in several mammalian sub-classes - this is not a comprehensive list for the proteins orthology.

Species	Common name	Divergence (MYA)	Accession number (from NCBI)	Sequence length	Percent identity	Percent Similarity
Homo sapiens	Human	0	NP_001004323.1	206	100%	100%
Ceratotherium simum	White Rhinoceros	96	XP_014652622.1	204	64%	81%
Canis lupus	Wolf	96	XP_008963687.1	203	64%	78%
Bos taurus	Cow	96	XP_005225278.1	204	64%	78%
Physeter catodon	Sperm Whale	96	XP_007110691.1	204	63%	76%
Condylura cristata	Mole	96	XP_004691685.1	204	62%	75%
Eptesicus fuscus	Brown bat	96	XP_008139625.1	213	61%	75%
Elephantulus edwardii	Elephant shrew	105	XP_006896643.1	147	58%	78%
Phascolarctos cinereus	Koala	159	XP_020834746.1	160	41%	58%
Sarcophilus harrisii	Tasmanian Devil	160	XP_012404266.1	162	37%	61%
