= DNA ligase 4 =

Enzyme found in humans

LIG4
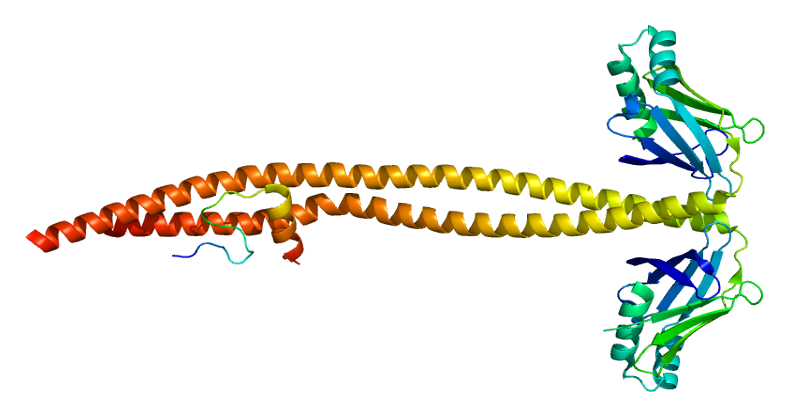

Identifiers
- Aliases: LIG4, LIG4S, DNA ligase 4
- External IDs: OMIM: 601837; MGI: 1335098; GeneCards: LIG4
Available structures
PDB	Ortholog search: PDBe RCSB
PDB	List of PDB id codes 1IK9, 2E2W, 3II6, 3VNN, 3W1B, 3W1G, 3W5O, 4HTO, 4HTP
Enzyme activity
EC #	BRENDA	ExPASy	KEGG	MetaCyc
6.5.1.1	↗	↗	↗	↗

Gene location (Human)
Chr.	Chromosome 13 (human)
Band	13q33.3	Start	108,207,439 bp
Band	13q33.3	End	108,218,368 bp

Gene location (Mouse)
Chr.	Chromosome 8 (mouse)
Band	8|8 A1.1	Start	10,019,049 bp
Band	8|8 A1.1	End	10,027,686 bp
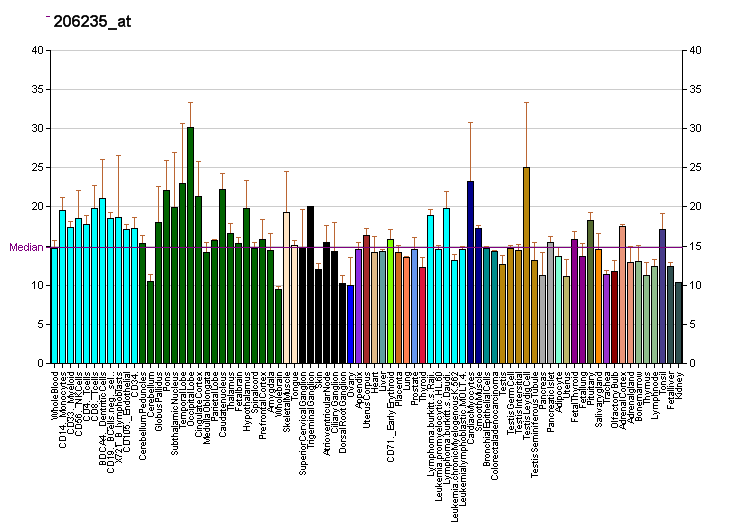
RNA expression pattern
Bgee	Human / Mouse (ortholog); Top expressed in: endothelial cell; oocyte; secondary oocyte; mucosa of paranasal sinus; retinal pigment epithelium; Brodmann area 23; islet of Langerhans; jejunal mucosa; primary visual cortex; lower lobe of lung / Top expressed in: primary oocyte; secondary oocyte; thymus; zygote; hand; trigeminal ganglion; otolith organ; epithelium of lens; utricle; substantia nigra; More reference expression data
BioGPS	More reference expression data
Gene ontology
Molecular function	nucleotide binding; metal ion binding; protein C-terminus binding; protein binding; ATP binding; DNA ligase (ATP) activity; ligase activity; DNA binding; DNA ligase activity
Cellular component	nucleoplasm; DNA ligase IV complex; nonhomologous end joining complex; condensed chromosome; nucleus; DNA-dependent protein kinase-DNA ligase 4 complex; cytoplasm; cytoplasmic ribonucleoprotein granule
Biological process	nucleotide-excision repair, DNA gap filling; double-strand break repair via classical nonhomologous end joining; response to ionizing radiation; DNA recombination; lagging strand elongation; DNA biosynthetic process; cellular response to lithium ion; single strand break repair; cellular response to DNA damage stimulus; cell division; DNA replication; positive regulation of chromosome organization; establishment of integrated proviral latency; cell cycle; response to X-ray; positive regulation of neurogenesis; DNA ligation involved in DNA recombination; DNA ligation; DNA ligation involved in DNA repair; somatic stem cell population maintenance; chromosome organization; T cell receptor V(D)J recombination; neuron apoptotic process; isotype switching; T cell differentiation in thymus; central nervous system development; immunoglobulin V(D)J recombination; double-strand break repair via nonhomologous end joining; positive regulation of fibroblast proliferation; in utero embryonic development; cell population proliferation; V(D)J recombination; pro-B cell differentiation; DNA repair; response to gamma radiation; double-strand break repair; negative regulation of neuron apoptotic process; cellular response to ionizing radiation
Sources:Amigo / QuickGO
Orthologs
Databases	NCBI: entry; OMA: entry
Species	Human	Mouse
Entrez	3981	319583
Ensembl	ENSG00000174405	ENSMUSG00000049717
UniProt	P49917	Q8BTF7
RefSeq (mRNA)	NM_001098268; NM_002312; NM_206937; NM_001330595; NM_001352598 NM_001352599; NM_001352600; NM_001352601; NM_001352602; NM_001352603; NM_001352604; NM_001379095	NM_176953; NM_001377042
RefSeq (protein)	NP_001091738; NP_001317524; NP_002303; NP_996820; NP_001339527 NP_001339528; NP_001339529; NP_001339530; NP_001339531; NP_001339532; NP_001339533; NP_001366024	NP_795927; NP_001363971
Location (UCSC)	Chr 13: 108.21 – 108.22 Mb	Chr 8: 10.02 – 10.03 Mb
PubMed search
- Wikidata
View/Edit Human	View/Edit Mouse

DNA ligase 4 or DNA ligase IV is an enzyme that in humans is encoded by the LIG4 gene.

== Function ==
DNA ligase 4 is an ATP-dependent DNA ligase that joins double-strand breaks during the non-homologous end joining pathway of double-strand break repair. It is also essential for V(D)J recombination. Lig4 forms a complex with XRCC4, and further interacts with the DNA-dependent protein kinase (DNA-PK) and XLF/Cernunnos, which are also required for NHEJ. The crystal structure of the Lig4/XRCC4 complex has been resolved. Defects in this gene are the cause of LIG4 syndrome. The yeast homolog of Lig4 is Dnl4.

== LIG4 syndrome ==
In humans, deficiency of DNA ligase 4 results in a clinical condition known as LIG4 syndrome. This syndrome is characterized by cellular radiation sensitivity, growth retardation, developmental delay, microcephaly, facial dysmorphisms, increased disposition to leukemia, variable degrees of immunodeficiency and reduced number of blood cells.

== Haematopoietic stem cell aging ==
Accumulation of DNA damage leading to stem cell exhaustion is regarded as an important aspect of aging. Deficiency of lig4 in pluripotent stem cells impairs Non-homologous end joining (NHEJ) and results in accumulation of DNA double-strand breaks and enhanced apoptosis. Lig4 deficiency in the mouse causes a progressive loss of haematopoietic stem cells and bone marrow cellularity during aging. The sensitivity of haematopoietic stem cells to lig4 deficiency suggests that lig4-mediated NHEJ is a key determinant of the ability of stem cells to maintain themselves against physiological stress over time.

== Interactions ==
LIG4 has been shown to interact with XRCC4 via its BRCT domain. This interaction stabilizes LIG4 protein in cells; cells that are deficient for XRCC4, such as XR-1 cells, have reduced levels of LIG4.

== Mechanism ==
LIG4 is an ATP-dependent DNA ligase. LIG4 uses ATP to adenylate itself and then transfers the AMP group to the 5' phosphate of one DNA end. Nucleophilic attack by the 3' hydroxyl group of a second DNA end and release of AMP yield the ligation product. Adenylation of LIG4 is stimulated by XRCC4 and XLF.
