= Immunodeficiency 26 =

- Immunodeficiency 26 is inherited in an autosomal recessive pattern.
- Specialty: Medical genetics

Immunodeficiency 26 is a rare genetic syndrome. It is characterised by absent circulating B and T cells and normal natural killer cells.

== Signs and symptoms ==
The features of this condition include recurrent candidiasis and lower respiratory tract infections.

== Genetics ==
This condition is due to mutations in the DNA-PKcs gene and is inheritable in an autosomal recessive fashion. The gene is located on the long arm of chromosome 8 (8q11.21) on the minus strand. It encodes a protein of 4128 amino acids with a predicted molecular weight of 469 kilodaltons. The encoded protein is a protein kinase that is activated by DNA. This protein acts as a sensor for damaged DNA.

== Diagnosis ==
Diagnosis is made by examination of the circulating lymphocytes and gene sequencing.

=== Differential diagnosis ===
- Ataxia telangectasia
- Artemis deficiency
- LIG4 syndrome
- Nijmegen breakage syndrome
- Severe combined immunodeficiency with Cernunnos
- X-linked agammaglobulinemia

== Epidemiology ==
This condition is rare. Only three cases have been described up to 2023.

== History ==
This condition was described in 2009 by van der Burg et al.
