= RNF168 =

Human protein-coding gene

Identifiers
- Aliases: RNF168, hring finger protein 168, RIDL
- External IDs: OMIM: 612688; MGI: 1917488; GeneCards: RNF168
Available structures
PDB	Ortholog search: PDBe RCSB
PDB	List of PDB id codes 3L11, 4GB0
Enzyme activity
EC #	BRENDA	ExPASy	KEGG	MetaCyc
2.3.2.27	↗	↗	↗	↗

Gene location (Human)
Chr.	Chromosome 3 (human)
Band	3q29	Start	196,468,783 bp
Band	3q29	End	196,503,768 bp

Gene location (Mouse)
Chr.	Chromosome 16 (mouse)
Band	16|16 B2	Start	32,096,277 bp
Band	16|16 B2	End	32,120,252 bp
RNA expression pattern
Bgee	Human / Mouse (ortholog); Top expressed in: sperm; tendon of biceps brachii; pancreatic epithelial cell; parietal pleura; visceral pleura; Achilles tendon; epithelium of nasopharynx; germinal epithelium; gonad; cardiac muscle tissue of right atrium / Top expressed in: zygote; secondary oocyte; genital tubercle; primary oocyte; Paneth cell; hand; otic vesicle; tail of embryo; substantia nigra; facial motor nucleus; More reference expression data
BioGPS	n/a
Gene ontology
Molecular function	chromatin binding; metal ion binding; K63-linked polyubiquitin modification-dependent protein binding; ubiquitin binding; protein binding; nucleosome binding; transferase activity; ubiquitin-protein transferase activity; histone binding
Cellular component	site of double-strand break; ubiquitin ligase complex; nucleoplasm; nucleus; cytosol; protein-containing complex
Biological process	response to ionizing radiation; interstrand cross-link repair; ubiquitin-dependent protein catabolic process; histone H2A-K13 ubiquitination; protein K63-linked ubiquitination; histone H2A K63-linked ubiquitination; negative regulation of transcription elongation from RNA polymerase II promoter; cellular response to DNA damage stimulus; protein ubiquitination; isotype switching; double-strand break repair via nonhomologous end joining; DNA repair; double-strand break repair; histone H2A monoubiquitination; histone H2A-K15 ubiquitination; positive regulation of DNA repair; chromatin organization; histone H2A ubiquitination
Sources:Amigo / QuickGO
Orthologs
Databases	NCBI: entry; OMA: entry
Species	Human	Mouse
Entrez	165918	70238
Ensembl	ENSG00000163961	ENSMUSG00000014074
UniProt	Q8IYW5	Q80XJ2
RefSeq (mRNA)	NM_152617	NM_027355
RefSeq (protein)	NP_689830	NP_081631
Location (UCSC)	Chr 3: 196.47 – 196.5 Mb	Chr 16: 32.1 – 32.12 Mb
PubMed search
- Wikidata
View/Edit Human	View/Edit Mouse

Ring finger protein 168 is a protein that in humans is encoded by the RNF168 gene.

This gene encodes an E3 ubiquitin ligase protein that contains a RING finger domain, a motif present in a variety of functionally distinct proteins and known to be involved in protein-DNA and protein-protein interactions. The protein is involved in double-strand breaks (DSB) repair. Mutations in this gene result in RIDDLE syndrome.
