= Ku80 =

Protein found in humans

XRCC5
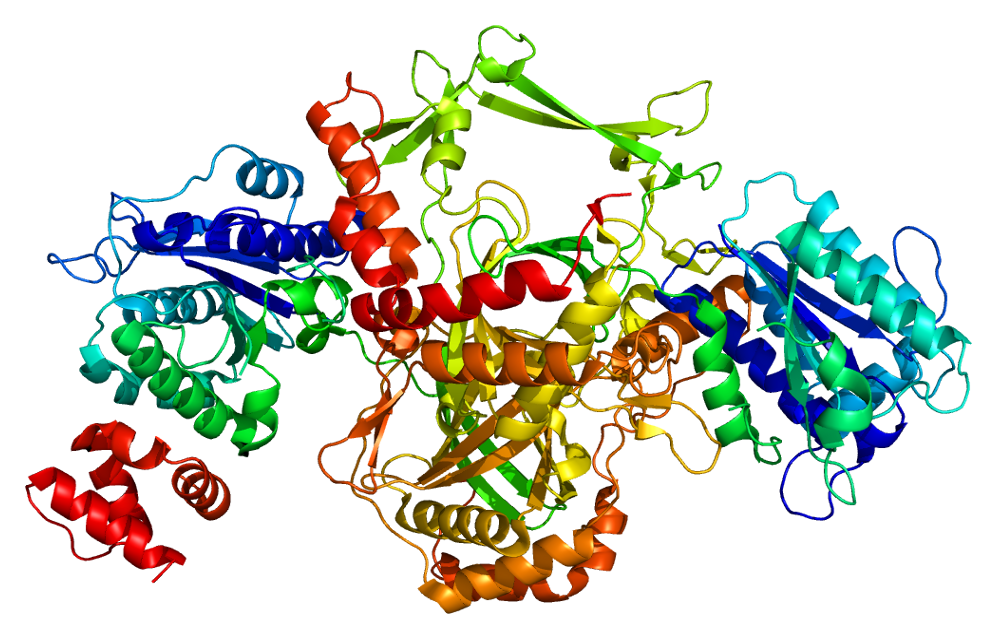

Identifiers
- Aliases: XRCC5, KARP-1, KARP1, KU80, KUB2, Ku86, NFIV, Ku80, X-ray repair complementing defective repair in Chinese hamster cells 5, X-ray repair cross complementing 5
- External IDs: OMIM: 194364; MGI: 104517; GeneCards: XRCC5
Available structures
PDB	Ortholog search: PDBe RCSB
PDB	List of PDB id codes 1JEQ, 1JEY, 1Q2Z, 1RW2, 3RZ9
Enzyme activity
EC #	BRENDA	ExPASy	KEGG	MetaCyc
4.2.99.18	↗	↗	↗	↗
5.6.2.4	↗	↗	↗	↗

Gene location (Human)
Chr.	Chromosome 2 (human)
Band	2q35	Start	216,107,464 bp
Band	2q35	End	216,206,303 bp

Gene location (Mouse)
Chr.	Chromosome 1 (mouse)
Band	1 C3|1 36.5 cM	Start	72,346,586 bp
Band	1 C3|1 36.5 cM	End	72,434,111 bp
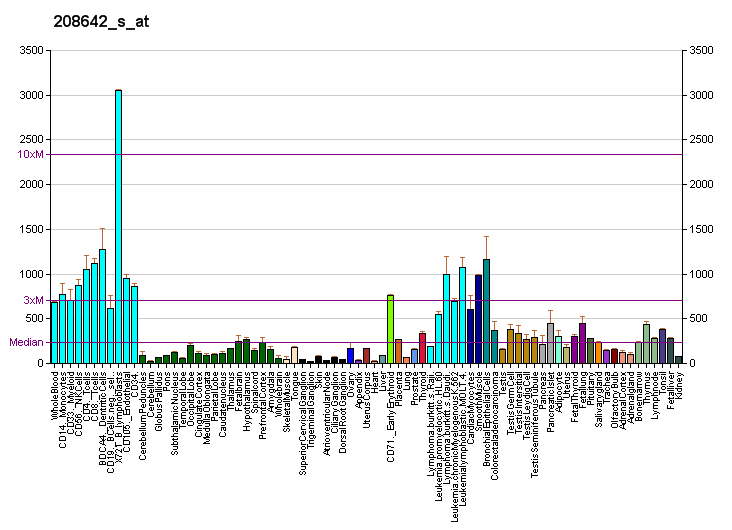

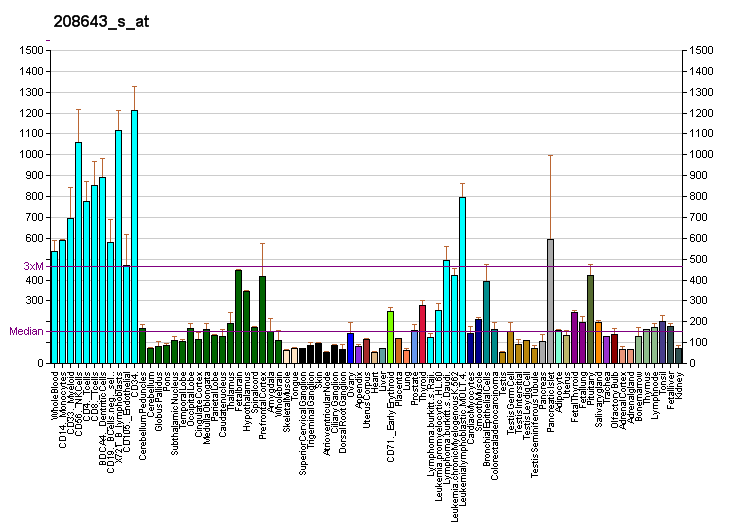
RNA expression pattern
Bgee	Human / Mouse (ortholog); Top expressed in: embryo; ganglionic eminence; ventricular zone; islet of Langerhans; stromal cell of endometrium; bone marrow; gonad; Achilles tendon; bone marrow cell; smooth muscle tissue / Top expressed in: saccule; otic placode; otic vesicle; genital tubercle; tail of embryo; primary oocyte; epiblast; right kidney; ventricular zone; primitive streak; More reference expression data
BioGPS	More reference expression data
Gene ontology
Molecular function	DNA binding; nucleotide binding; double-stranded telomeric DNA binding; telomeric DNA binding; helicase activity; 5'-deoxyribose-5-phosphate lyase activity; DNA helicase activity; hydrolase activity, acting on acid anhydrides; protein C-terminus binding; protein binding; hydrolase activity; ATP binding; ubiquitin protein ligase binding; double-stranded DNA binding; damaged DNA binding; RNA binding; enzyme activator activity; protein-containing complex binding; DNA end binding
Cellular component	cytoplasm; cytosol; nuclear telomere cap complex; membrane; plasma membrane; nucleoplasm; chromosome; nucleolus; nonhomologous end joining complex; nucleus; extracellular region; secretory granule lumen; protein-DNA complex; Ku70:Ku80 complex; protein-containing complex; site of DNA damage; ribonucleoprotein complex
Biological process	DNA recombination; regulation of transcription, DNA-templated; regulation of smooth muscle cell proliferation; transcription, DNA-templated; cellular response to DNA damage stimulus; positive regulation of neurogenesis; hematopoietic stem cell differentiation; double-strand break repair; negative regulation of t-circle formation; establishment of integrated proviral latency; cell population proliferation; negative regulation of transcription, DNA-templated; positive regulation of type I interferon production; cellular hyperosmotic salinity response; DNA repair; DNA duplex unwinding; brain development; cellular response to fatty acid; double-strand break repair via nonhomologous end joining; neutrophil degranulation; cellular response to gamma radiation; cellular response to X-ray; telomere maintenance; regulation of telomere maintenance; positive regulation of telomere maintenance via telomerase; positive regulation of catalytic activity; positive regulation of protein kinase activity; positive regulation of telomerase activity; protein localization to chromosome, telomeric region; cellular response to leukemia inhibitory factor; activation of innate immune response; immune system process; innate immune response
Sources:Amigo / QuickGO
Orthologs
Databases	NCBI: entry; OMA: entry
Species	Human	Mouse
Entrez	7520	22596
Ensembl	ENSG00000079246	ENSMUSG00000026187
UniProt	P13010	P27641
RefSeq (mRNA)	NM_021141	NM_009533; NM_001357519; NM_001357520
RefSeq (protein)	NP_066964	NP_033559; NP_001344448; NP_001344449
Location (UCSC)	Chr 2: 216.11 – 216.21 Mb	Chr 1: 72.35 – 72.43 Mb
PubMed search
- Wikidata
View/Edit Human	View/Edit Mouse

Ku80 is a protein that, in humans, is encoded by the XRCC5 gene. Together, Ku70 and Ku80 make up the Ku heterodimer, which binds to DNA double-strand break ends and is required for the non-homologous end joining (NHEJ) pathway of DNA repair. It is also required for V(D)J recombination, which utilizes the NHEJ pathway to promote antigen diversity in the mammalian immune system.

In addition to its role in NHEJ, Ku is required for telomere length maintenance and subtelomeric gene silencing.

Ku was originally identified when patients with systemic lupus erythematosus were found to have high levels of autoantibodies to the protein.

== Nomenclature ==
Ku80 has been referred to by several names including:

- Lupus Ku autoantigen protein p80
- ATP-dependent DNA helicase 2 subunit 2
- X-ray repair complementing defective repair in Chinese hamster cells 5
- X-ray repair cross-complementing 5 (XRCC5)

== Epigenetic repression ==
The protein expression level of Ku80 can be repressed by epigenetic hypermethylation of the promoter region of gene XRCC5 which encodes Ku80. In a study of 87 matched pairs of primary tumors of non-small-cell lung carcinoma and nearby normal lung tissue, 25% of the tumors had loss of heterozygosity at the XRCC5 locus and a similar percentage of tumors had hypermethylation of the promoter region of XRCC5. Low protein expression of Ku80 was significantly associated with low mRNA expression and with XRCC5 promoter hypermethylation but not with LOH of the gene.

== Senescence ==
Mouse mutants with homozygous defects in Ku80 experience an early onset of senescence. Ku80(-/-) mice exhibit aging-related pathology (osteopenia, atrophic skin, hepatocellular degeneration, hepatocellular inclusions, hepatic hyperplastic foci and age-specific mortality). Furthermore, Ku80(-/-) mice exhibit severely reduced lifespan and size. Loss of only a single Ku80 allele in Ku(-/+) heterozygous mice causes accelerated aging in skeletal muscle, although post natal growth is normal. An analysis of the level of Ku80 protein in human, cow, and mouse indicated that Ku80 levels vary dramatically between species, and that these levels are strongly correlated with species longevity. These results suggest that the NHEJ pathway of DNA repair mediated by Ku80 plays a significant role in repairing double-strand breaks that would otherwise cause early senescence (see DNA damage theory of aging).

== Clinical significance ==
A rare microsatellite polymorphism in this gene is associated with cancer in patients of varying radiosensitivity.

=== Deficiency in cancer ===
A deficiency in expression of a DNA repair gene increases the risk for cancer (see Deficient DNA repair in carcinogenesis). Ku80 protein expression was found to be deficient in melanoma. In addition, low expression of Ku80 was found in 15% of adenocarcinoma type and 32% of squamous cell type non-small cell lung cancers, and this was correlated with hypermethylation of the XRCC5 promoter.

Ku80 appears to be one of 26 different DNA repair proteins that are epigenetically repressed in various cancers (see Cancer epigenetics).

== Interactions ==
Ku80 has been shown to interact with:

- DNA-PKcs,
- GCN5L2,
- Ku70,
- NCOA6,
- PCNA,
- POU2F1,
- TERF2IP,
- Telomerase reverse transcriptase,
- Tyrosine kinase 2, and
- Werner syndrome ATP-dependent helicase.
