= Non-homologous end-joining factor 1 =

Protein-coding gene in the species Homo sapiens

NHEJ1
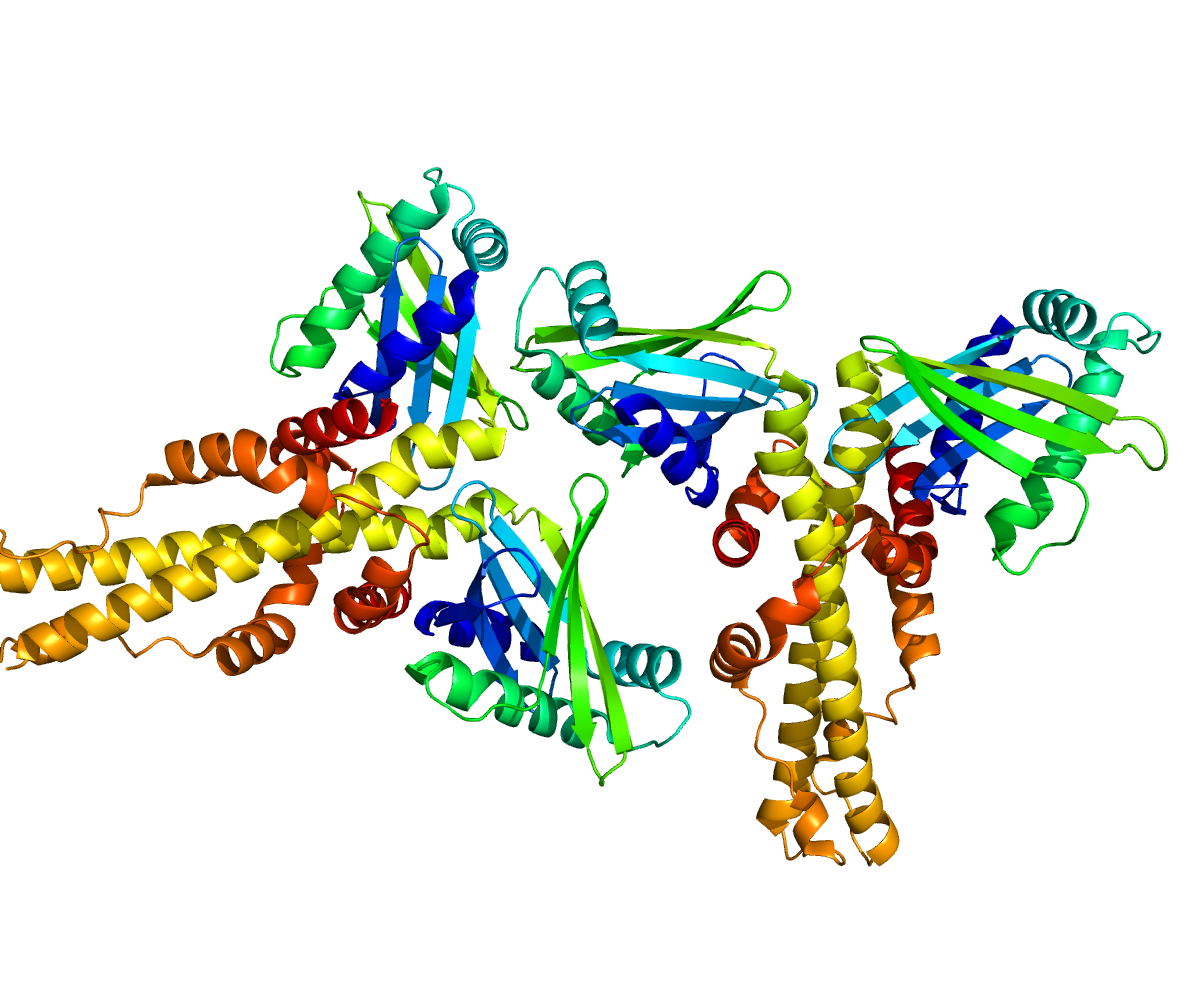
Available structures
PDB	Ortholog search: PDBe RCSB
PDB	List of PDB id codes 2QM4, 2R9A, 3Q4F, 3RWR, 3SR2, 3W03

Identifiers
- Aliases: NHEJ1, XLF, non-homologous end joining factor 1
- External IDs: OMIM: 611290; MGI: 1922820; HomoloGene: 11714; GeneCards: NHEJ1; OMA:NHEJ1 - orthologs

Gene location (Human)
Chr.	Chromosome 2 (human)
Band	2q35	Start	219,075,317 bp
Band	2q35	End	219,160,865 bp

Gene location (Mouse)
Chr.	Chromosome 1 (mouse)
Band	1|1 C4	Start	75,006,298 bp
Band	1|1 C4	End	75,101,844 bp
RNA expression pattern
Bgee	Human / Mouse (ortholog); Top expressed in: rectum; gonad; mucosa of transverse colon; monocyte; gastrocnemius muscle; left testis; smooth muscle tissue; right testis; Achilles tendon; testicle / Top expressed in: yolk sac; granulocyte; secondary oocyte; zygote; right kidney; spermatocyte; primary oocyte; spermatid; proximal tubule; morula; More reference expression data
BioGPS	n/a
Gene ontology
Molecular function	DNA binding; protein binding; DNA end binding
Cellular component	nonhomologous end joining complex; nucleus; nucleoplasm; fibrillar center; DNA ligase IV complex
Biological process	response to ionizing radiation; B cell differentiation; central nervous system development; positive regulation of ligase activity; T cell differentiation; double-strand break repair via nonhomologous end joining; cellular response to DNA damage stimulus; double-strand break repair; DNA repair
Sources:Amigo / QuickGO
Orthologs
Species	Human	Mouse
Entrez	79840	75570
Ensembl	ENSG00000187736	ENSMUSG00000026162
UniProt	Q9H9Q4	Q3KNJ2
RefSeq (mRNA)	NM_024782	NM_029342
RefSeq (protein)	NP_079058; NP_001364427; NP_001364428	NP_083618
Location (UCSC)	Chr 2: 219.08 – 219.16 Mb	Chr 1: 75.01 – 75.1 Mb
PubMed search
- Wikidata
View/Edit Human	View/Edit Mouse

Non-homologous end-joining factor 1 (NHEJ1), also known as Cernunnos or XRCC4-like factor (XLF), is a protein that in humans is encoded by the NHEJ1 gene. XLF was originally discovered as the protein mutated in five patients with growth retardation, microcephaly, and immunodeficiency. The protein is required for the non-homologous end joining (NHEJ) pathway of DNA repair. Patients with XLF mutations also have immunodeficiency due to a defect in V(D)J recombination, which uses NHEJ to generate diversity in the antibody repertoire of the immune system. XLF interacts with DNA ligase IV and XRCC4 and is thought to be involved in the end-bridging or ligation steps of NHEJ. The yeast (Saccharomyces cerevisiae) homolog of XLF is Nej1.

== Phenotypes ==
In contrast to the profound immunodeficiency phenotype of XLF deletion in humans, deletion of XLF alone has a mild phenotype in mice. However, combining a deletion of XLF with deletion of the ATM kinase causes a synthetic defect in NHEJ, suggesting partial redundancy in the function of these two proteins in mice.

== Structure ==
XLF is structurally similar to XRCC4, existing as a constitutive dimer with an N-terminal globular head domain, an alpha-helical stalk, and an unstructured C-terminal region (CTR).

== Interactions ==
XLF has been shown to interact with XRCC4, and with Ku protein, and it can also interact weakly with DNA. Co-crystal structures of XLF and XRCC4 suggest that the two proteins can form hetero-oligomers via head-to-head interaction of alternating XLF and XRCC4 subunits. These XRCC4-XLF filaments have been proposed to bridge DNA prior to end ligation during NHEJ. Formation of XRCC4-XLF oligomers can be disrupted by interaction of the C-terminal domain of XRCC4 with the BRCT domain of DNA ligase IV.

== Hematopoietic stem cell aging ==
Deficiency of NHEJ1 in mice leads to premature aging of hematopoietic stem cells as indicated by several lines of evidence including evidence that long-term repopulation is defective and worsens over time. Using a human induced pluripotent stem cell model of NHEJ1 deficiency, it was shown that NHEJ1 has an important role in promoting survival of the primitive hematopoietic progenitors. These NHEJ1 deficient cells possess a weak NHEJ1-mediated repair capacity that is apparently incapable of coping with DNA damages induced by physiological stress, normal metabolism, and ionizing radiation.
