= Somatic recombination =

Alteration of the DNA of a somatic cell that is inherited by its daughter cells

Somatic recombination, as opposed to the genetic recombination that occurs in meiosis, is an alteration of the DNA of a somatic cell that is inherited by its daughter cells. The term is usually reserved for large-scale alterations of DNA such as chromosomal translocations and deletions and not applied to point mutations. Somatic recombination occurs physiologically in the assembly of the B cell receptor and T-cell receptor genes (V(D)J recombination), as well as in the class switching of immunoglobulins. Somatic recombination is also important in the process of carcinogenesis.

In neurons of the human brain, somatic recombination occurs in the gene that encodes the amyloid precursor protein APP. Neurons from individuals with sporadic Alzheimer's disease show greater APP gene diversity due to somatic recombination than neurons from healthy individuals.

== Plants ==
Intrachromosomal homologous recombination in Arabidopsis thaliana plants was found to occur in all organs examined from the seed stage to the flowering stage of somatic plant development. Recombination frequencies were typically in the range of 10^{−6} to 10^{−7} events per genome. A. thaliana mutants selected for hypersensitivity to X-irradiation also proved to be simultaneously hypersensitive to the DNA damaging agents mitomycin C and/or methyl methanesulfonate. The mutants were also deficient in somatic homologous recombination. These findings suggest that repair of some types of DNA damage requires a recombinational process that was defective in the mutants studied. In nature, plants are continuously exposed to UV-B (280–320 nm) radiation, a component of sunlight that damages the DNA of somatic cells. Cyclobutane pyrimidine dimers (CPD) are a type of damage induced by UV-B. In A. thaliana, homologous recombination appears to be directly involved in repairing CPD damage.
