= LIG4 syndrome =

- Other names: Ligase IV syndrome
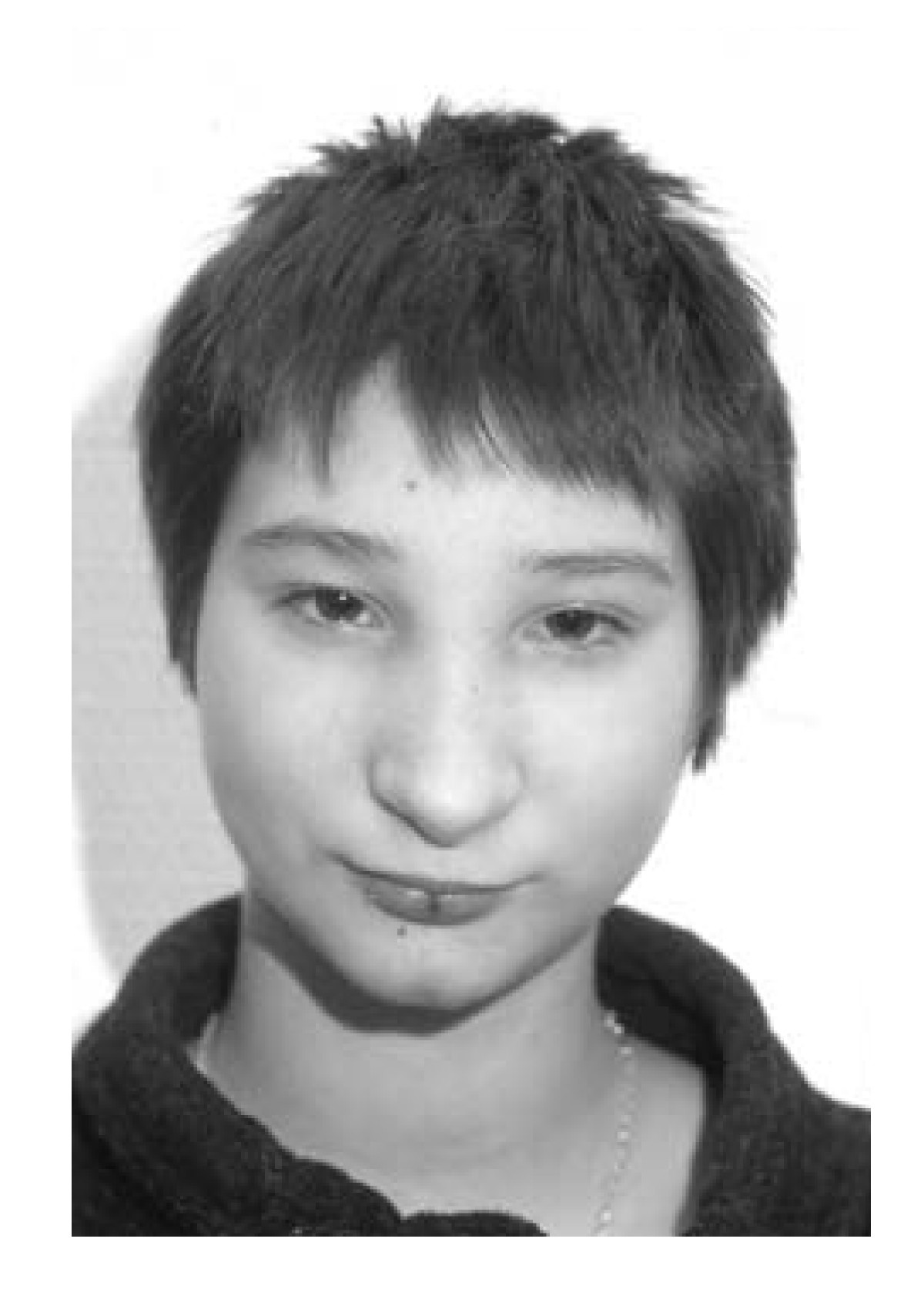
- Person at age 12 showing dysmorphic features

LIG4 syndrome or ligase IV syndrome is an extremely rare condition caused by mutations in the DNA ligase IV (LIG4) gene. Some mutations in this gene are associated with a resistance against multiple myeloma and severe combined immunodeficiency. Severity of symptoms depends on the degree of reduced enzymatic activity of Ligase IV or gene expression. Ligase IV is a critical component of the non-homologous end joining (NHEJ) mechanism that repairs DNA double-strand breaks. It is employed in repairing DNA double-strand breaks caused by reactive oxygen species produced by normal metabolism, or by DNA damaging agents such as ionizing radiation. NHEJ is also used to repair the DNA double-strand break intermediates that occur in the production of T and B lymphocyte receptors.

As DNA ligase IV is essential in V(D)J recombination, the mechanism by which immunoglobulins, B cell and T cell receptors are formed, patients with LIG4 syndrome may have less effective or defective V(D)J recombination. Some patients have a severe immunodeficiency characterized by pancytopenia, causing chronic respiratory infections and sinusitis. Clinical features also include Seckel syndrome-like facial abnormalities and microcephaly. Patients also have growth retardation and skin conditions, including photosensitivity, psoriasis and telangiectasia. Although not present in all, patients may also present with hypothyroidism and type II diabetes and possibly malignancies such as acute T-cell leukemia. The clinical phenotype of LIG4 syndrome closely resembles that of Nijmegen breakage syndrome (NBS).

== See also ==
- LIG4
- List of cutaneous conditions
