= Ku (protein) =

Ku complex family
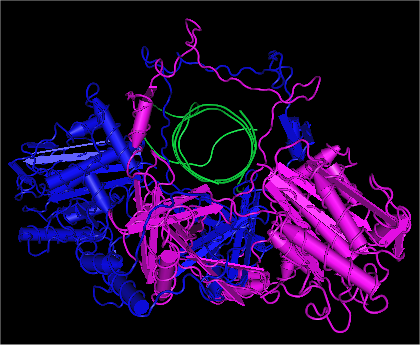

Identifiers
- Aliases: Ku70:Ku80 heterodimerKu70:Ku80Ku Autoantigen
- External IDs: GeneCards:
Orthologs
Databases	n/a
Species	Human	Mouse
Entrez	n/a	n/a
Ensembl	n/a	n/a
UniProt	n a	n/a
RefSeq (mRNA)	n/a	n/a
RefSeq (protein)	n/a	n/a
Location (UCSC)	n/a	n/a
PubMed search	n/a	n/a
- Wikidata
View/Edit Human

X-ray repair cross-complementing 5
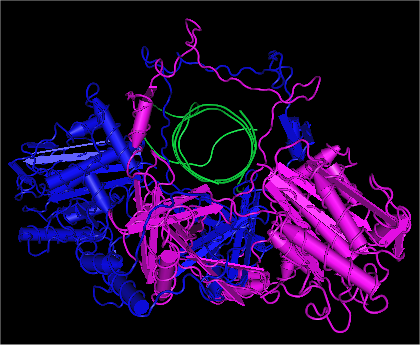
- Crystal structure of human Ku bound to DNA. Ku70 is shown in purple, Ku80 in blue, and the DNA strand in green.

Identifiers
- Symbol: XRCC5
- Alt. symbols: Ku80
- NCBI gene: 7520
- HGNC: 12833
- OMIM: 194364
- PDB: 1JEY
- RefSeq: NM_021141
- UniProt: P13010

Other data
- Locus: Chr. 2 q35
Search for
- Structures: Swiss-model
- Domains: InterPro

X-ray repair cross-complementing 6

Identifiers
- Symbol: XRCC6
- Alt. symbols: Ku70, G22P1
- NCBI gene: 2547
- HGNC: 4055
- OMIM: 152690
- PDB: 1JEY
- RefSeq: NM_001469
- UniProt: P12956

Other data
- Locus: Chr. 22 q11-q13
Search for
- Structures: Swiss-model
- Domains: InterPro

Ku70/Ku80 N-terminal alpha/beta domain
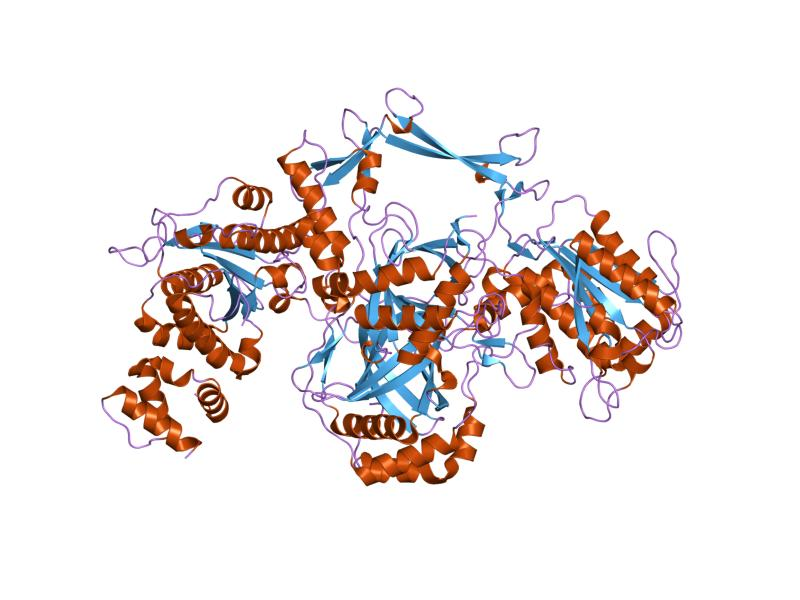
- crystal structure of the ku heterodimer

Identifiers
- Symbol: Ku_N
- Pfam: PF03731
- Pfam clan: CL0128
- InterPro: IPR005161
- SCOP2: 1jey / SCOPe / SUPFAM
Available protein structures:
- PDB: IPR005161 PF03731 (ECOD; PDBsum)
- AlphaFold: IPR005161; PF03731

Ku70/Ku80 beta-barrel domain
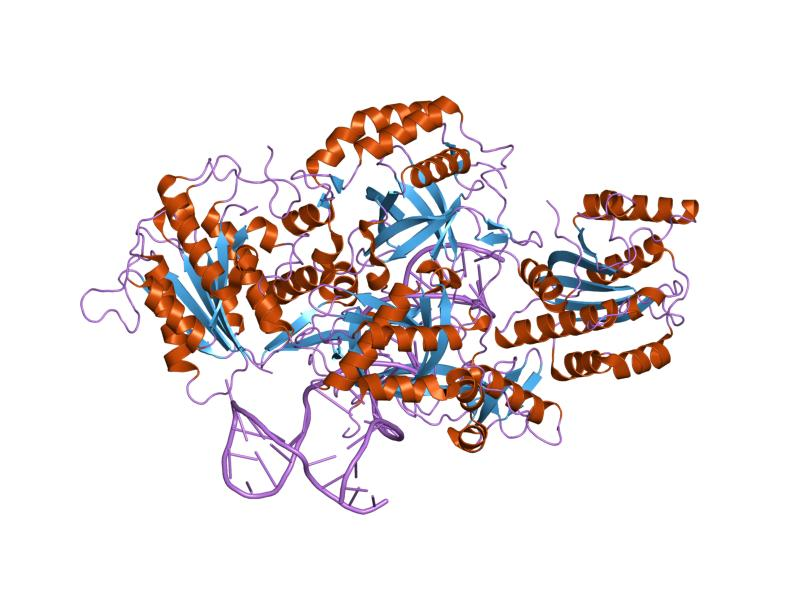
- crystal structure of the ku heterodimer bound to dna

Identifiers
- Symbol: Ku
- Pfam: PF02735
- InterPro: IPR006164
- PROSITE: PDOC00252
- SCOP2: 1jey / SCOPe / SUPFAM
Available protein structures:
- PDB: IPR006164 PF02735 (ECOD; PDBsum)
- AlphaFold: IPR006164; PF02735

Ku70/Ku80 C-terminal arm
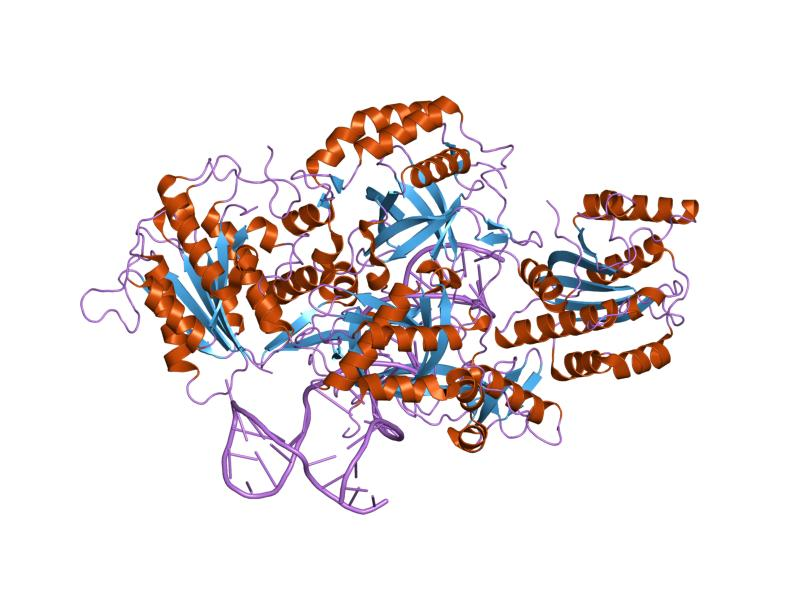
- crystal structure of the ku heterodimer bound to dna

Identifiers
- Symbol: Ku_C
- Pfam: PF03730
- InterPro: IPR005160
- SCOP2: 1jey / SCOPe / SUPFAM
Available protein structures:
- PDB: IPR005160 PF03730 (ECOD; PDBsum)
- AlphaFold: IPR005160; PF03730

Ku C terminal domain like
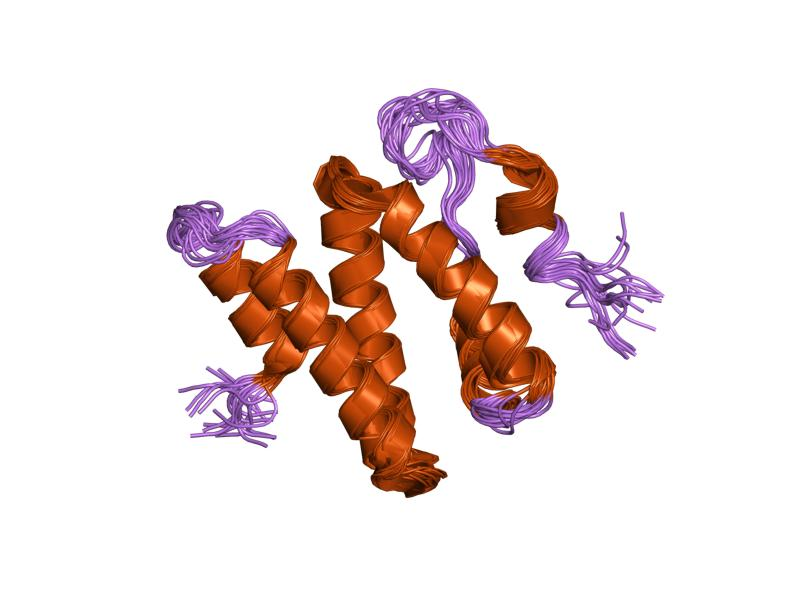
- the 3d solution structure of the c-terminal region of ku86

Identifiers
- Symbol: Ku_PK_bind
- Pfam: PF08785
- InterPro: IPR014893
- SCOP2: 1q2z / SCOPe / SUPFAM
Available protein structures:
- PDB: IPR014893 PF08785 (ECOD; PDBsum)
- AlphaFold: IPR014893; PF08785

Ku is a dimeric protein complex that binds to DNA double-strand break ends and is required for the non-homologous end joining (NHEJ) pathway of DNA repair. Ku is evolutionarily conserved from bacteria to humans. The ancestral bacterial Ku is a homodimer (two copies of the same protein bound to each other). Eukaryotic Ku is a heterodimer of two polypeptides, Ku70 (XRCC6) and Ku80 (XRCC5), so named because the molecular weight of the human Ku proteins is around 70 kDa and 80 kDa. The two Ku subunits form a basket-shaped structure that threads onto the DNA end. Once bound, Ku can slide down the DNA strand, allowing more Ku molecules to thread onto the end. In higher eukaryotes, Ku forms a complex with the DNA-dependent protein kinase catalytic subunit (DNA-PKcs) to form the full DNA-dependent protein kinase, DNA-PK. Ku is thought to function as a molecular scaffold to which other proteins involved in NHEJ can bind, orienting the double-strand break for ligation.

The Ku70 and Ku80 proteins consist of three structural domains. The N-terminal domain is an alpha/beta domain. This domain only makes a small contribution to the dimer interface. The domain comprises a six-stranded beta sheet of the Rossmann fold. The central domain of Ku70 and Ku80 is a DNA-binding beta-barrel domain. Ku makes only a few contacts with the sugar-phosphate backbone, and none with the DNA bases, but it fits sterically to major and minor groove contours forming a ring that encircles duplex DNA, cradling two full turns of the DNA molecule. By forming a bridge between the broken DNA ends, Ku acts to structurally support and align the DNA ends, to protect them from degradation, and to prevent promiscuous binding to unbroken DNA. Ku effectively aligns the DNA, while still allowing access of polymerases, nucleases and ligases to the broken DNA ends to promote end joining. The C-terminal arm is an alpha helical region which embraces the central beta-barrel domain of the opposite subunit. In some cases a fourth domain is present at the C-terminus, which binds to DNA-dependent protein kinase catalytic subunit.

Both subunits of Ku have been experimentally knocked out in mice. These mice exhibit chromosomal instability, indicating that NHEJ is important for genome maintenance.

In many organisms, Ku has additional functions at telomeres in addition to its role in DNA repair.

Abundance of Ku80 seems to be related to species longevity.

== Aging ==
Mutant mice defective in Ku70, or Ku80, or double mutant mice deficient in both Ku70 and Ku80 exhibit early aging. The mean lifespans of the three mutant mouse strains were similar to each other, at about 37 weeks, compared to 108 weeks for the wild-type control. Six specific signs of aging were examined, and the three mutant mice were found to display the same aging signs as the control mice, but at a much earlier age. Cancer incidence was not increased in the mutant mice. These results suggest that Ku function is important for longevity assurance and that the NHEJ pathway of DNA repair (mediated by Ku) has a key role in repairing DNA double-strand breaks that would otherwise cause early aging. (Also see DNA damage theory of aging.)

== Plants ==
Ku70 and Ku80 have also been experimentally characterized in plants, where they appear to play a similar role to that in other eukaryotes. In rice, suppression of either protein has been shown to promote homologous recombination (HR) This effect was exploited to improve gene targeting (GT) efficiency in Arabidopsis thaliana. In the study, the frequency of HR-based GT using a zinc-finger nuclease (ZFN) was increased up to sixteen times in ku70 mutants This result has promising implications for genome editing across eukaryotes as DSB repair mechanisms are highly conserved. A substantial difference is that in plants, Ku is also involved in maintaining an alternate telomere morphology characterized by blunt-ends or short (≤ 3-nt) 3’ overhangs. This function is independent of the role of Ku in DSB repair, as removing the ability of the Ku complex to translocate along DNA has been shown to preserve blunt-ended telomeres while impeding DNA repair.

== Bacteria and archaea ==
Bacteria usually have only one Ku gene (if they have one at all). Unusually, Mesorhizobium loti has two, mlr9624 and mlr9623.

Archaea usually also only have one Ku gene (for the ~4% of species that have one at all). The evolutionary history is blurred by extensive horizontal gene transfer with bacteria.

Bacterial and archaeal Ku proteins are unlike their eukaryotic counterparts in that they only have the central beta-barrel domain.

== Name ==
The name 'Ku' is derived from the surname of the Japanese patient in which it was discovered.
