= Mir-101 microRNA precursor family =

mir-101 microRNA precursor family
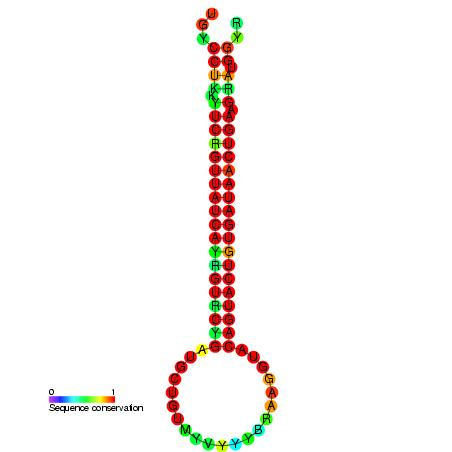
- Predicted secondary structure and sequence conservation of mir-101

Identifiers
- Symbol: mir-101
- Rfam: RF00253
- miRBase: MI0000103
- miRBase family: MIPF0000046

Other data
- RNA type: Gene; miRNA
- Domain: Eukaryota
- GO: GO:0035195 GO:0035068
- SO: SO:0001244
- PDB structures: PDBe

miR-101 microRNA precursor is a small non-coding RNA that regulates gene expression. Expression of miR-101 has been validated in both human (MI0000103, MI0000739) and mouse (MI0000148). This microRNA appears to be specific to the vertebrates and has now been predicted or confirmed in a wide range of vertebrate species (MIPF0000046). The precursor microRNA is a stem-loop structure of about 70 nucleotides in length that is processed by the Dicer enzyme to form the 21-24 nucleotide mature microRNA. In this case the mature sequence is excised from the 3' arm of the hairpin.

Survival analysis shows that hsa-miR-101 is associated with survival in multiple breast cancer datasets.
