= Artemis (protein) =

Protein-coding gene in the species Homo sapiens

DCLRE1C
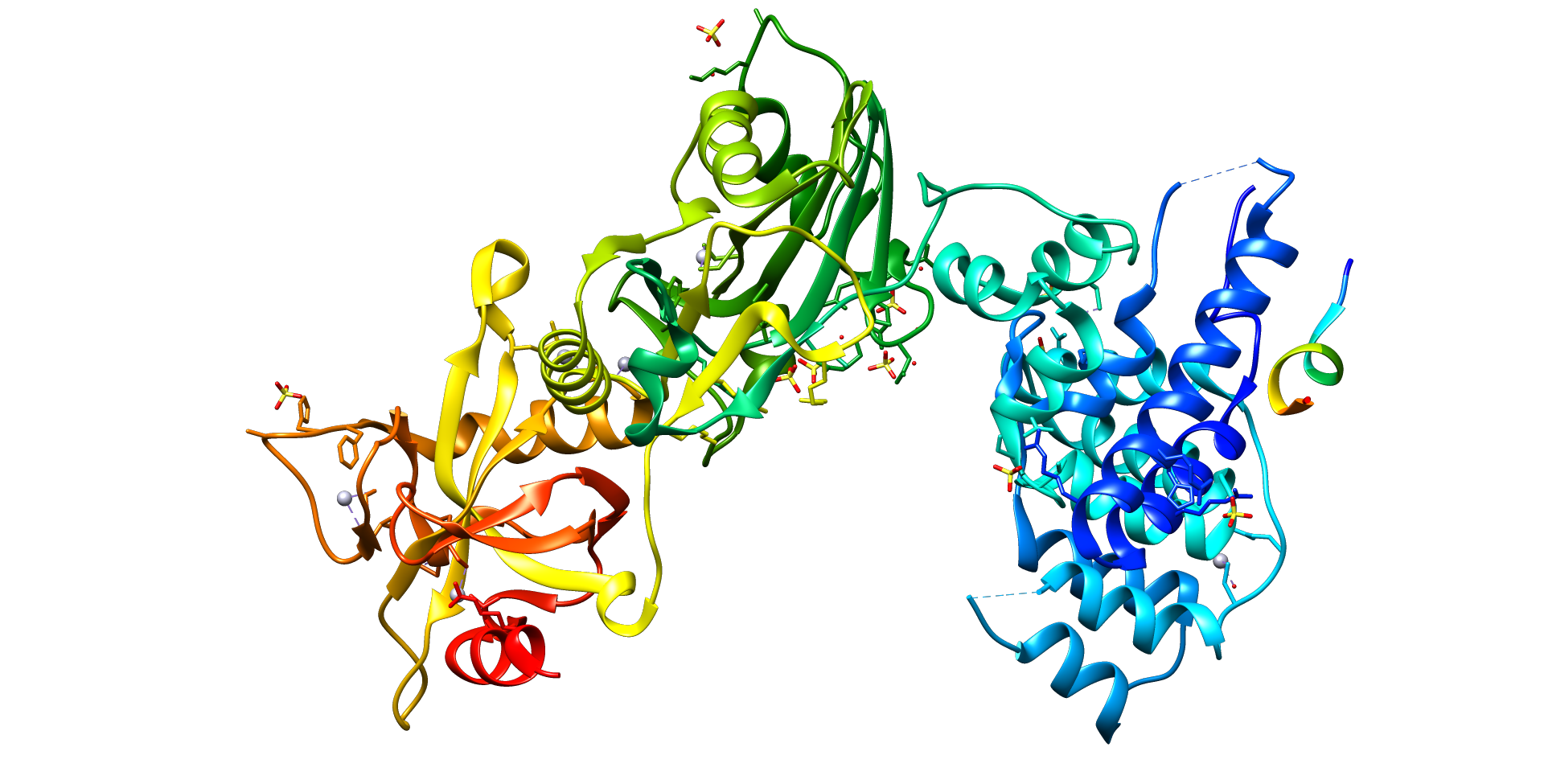

Identifiers
- Aliases: DCLRE1C, A-SCID, DCLREC1C, RS-SCID, SCIDA, SNM1C, DNA cross-link repair 1C
- External IDs: OMIM: 605988; MGI: 2441769; GeneCards: DCLRE1C
Available structures
PDB	Ortholog search: PDBe RCSB
PDB	List of PDB id codes 3W1B, 3W1G, 4HTP

Gene location (Human)
Chr.	Chromosome 10 (human)
Band	10p13	Start	14,897,359 bp
Band	10p13	End	14,954,432 bp

Gene location (Mouse)
Chr.	Chromosome 2 (mouse)
Band	2|2 A1	Start	3,425,168 bp
Band	2|2 A1	End	3,465,167 bp
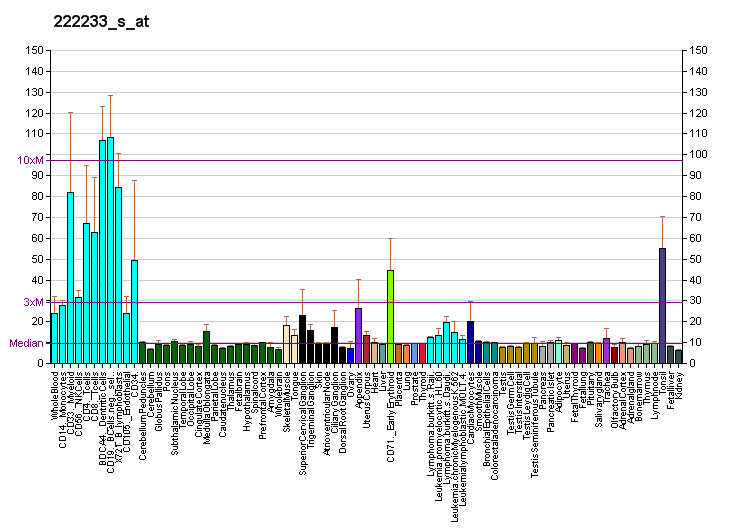

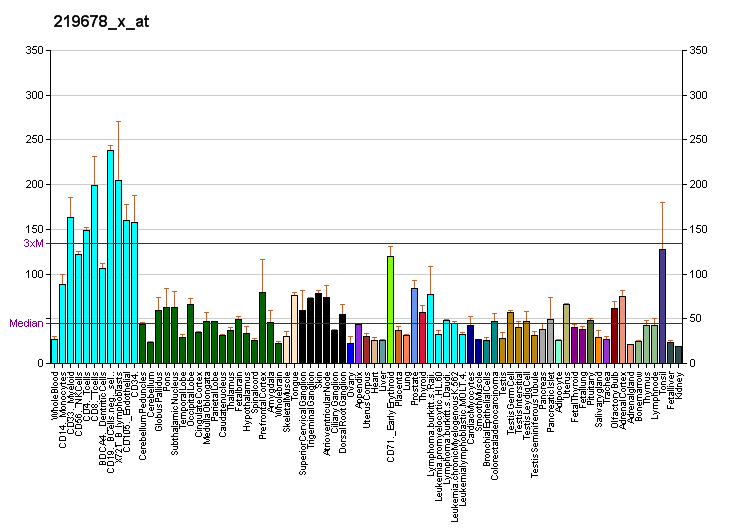
RNA expression pattern
Bgee	Human / Mouse (ortholog); Top expressed in: buccal mucosa cell; tendon of biceps brachii; epithelium of nasopharynx; sperm; nipple; pylorus; cardia; superior surface of tongue; endothelial cell; amniotic fluid / Top expressed in: granulocyte; tail of embryo; zygote; genital tubercle; morula; thymus; spermatocyte; yolk sac; blastocyst; embryo; More reference expression data
BioGPS	More reference expression data
Gene ontology
Molecular function	5'-3' exonuclease activity; 5'-3' exodeoxyribonuclease activity; damaged DNA binding; single-stranded DNA endodeoxyribonuclease activity; protein binding; nuclease activity; endonuclease activity; exonuclease activity; hydrolase activity
Cellular component	nonhomologous end joining complex; nucleus; nucleoplasm; Golgi apparatus
Biological process	response to ionizing radiation; DNA recombination; adaptive immune response; interstrand cross-link repair; protection from non-homologous end joining at telomere; immune system process; chromosome organization; cellular response to DNA damage stimulus; V(D)J recombination; B cell differentiation; double-strand break repair via nonhomologous end joining; telomere maintenance; nucleic acid phosphodiester bond hydrolysis; double-strand break repair; DNA repair
Sources:Amigo / QuickGO
Orthologs
Databases	NCBI: entry; OMA: entry
Species	Human	Mouse
Entrez	64421	227525
Ensembl	ENSG00000152457	ENSMUSG00000026648
UniProt	Q96SD1	Q8K4J0
RefSeq (mRNA)	NM_001033855; NM_001033857; NM_001033858; NM_001289076; NM_001289077 NM_001289078; NM_001289079; NM_022487; NM_001350965; NM_001350966; NM_001350967	NM_001110214; NM_146114; NM_175683; NM_001302674; NM_001302684 NM_001362903; NM_001362904
RefSeq (protein)	NP_001029027; NP_001029029; NP_001029030; NP_001276005; NP_001276006 NP_001276007; NP_001276008; NP_071932; NP_001337894; NP_001337895; NP_001337896	NP_001103684; NP_001289603; NP_001289613; NP_666226; NP_783614 NP_001349832; NP_001349833
Location (UCSC)	Chr 10: 14.9 – 14.95 Mb	Chr 2: 3.43 – 3.47 Mb
PubMed search
- Wikidata
View/Edit Human	View/Edit Mouse

Artemis is a protein that in humans is encoded by the DCLRE1C (DNA cross-link repair 1C) gene.

== Function ==
Artemis is a nuclear protein that is involved in V(D)J recombination and DNA repair. The protein has endonuclease activity on 5' and 3' overhangs and hairpins when complexed with PRKDC.

=== Immune response ===
Artemis plays an essential role in V(D)J recombination, the process by which B cell antibody genes and T cell receptor genes are assembled from individual V (variable), D (diversity), and J (joining) segments. For example, in joining a V segment to a D segment, the RAG (recombination activating gene) nuclease cuts both DNA strands adjacent to a V segment and adjacent to a D segment. The intervening DNA between the V and D segments is ligated to form a circular DNA molecule that is lost from the chromosome. At each of the two remaining ends, called the coding ends, the two strands of DNA are joined to form a hairpin structure. Artemis nuclease, in a complex with the DNA-dependent protein kinase (DNA‑PK), binds to these DNA ends and makes a single cut near the tip of the hairpin. The exposed 3' termini are subject to deletion and addition of nucleotides by a variety of exonucleases and DNA polymerases, before the V and D segments are ligated to restore the integrity of the chromosome. The exact site of cleavage of the hairpin by Artemis is variable, and this variability, combined with random nucleotide deletion and addition, confers extreme diversity upon the resulting antibody and T-cell receptor genes, thus allowing the immune system to mount an immune response to virtually any foreign antigen. In Artemis-deficient individuals, V(D)J recombination is blocked because the hairpin ends cannot be opened, and so no mature B or T cells are produced, a condition known as severe combined immune deficiency (SCID). Artemis was first identified as the gene defective in a subset of SCID patients that were unusually sensitive to radiation.

=== Repair of DNA breaks ===
Cells deficient in Artemis are more sensitive than normal cells to X‑rays and to chemical agents that induce double-strand breaks (DSBs), and they show a higher incidence of chromosome breaks following irradiation. Direct measurement of DSBs by pulsed-field electrophoresis indicates that in Artemis-deficient cells 75-90% of DSBs are repaired rapidly, just as in normal cells. However, the remaining 10-20% of DSBs that are repaired more slowly (2-24 hr) in normal cells, are not repaired at all in Artemis-deficient cells. Repair of these presumably difficult-to-rejoin breaks also requires several other proteins, including the Mre11/Rad50/NBS1 complex, the ataxia telangiectasia mutated ATM kinase, and 53BP1. Because Artemis can remove damaged ends from DNA, it has been proposed that these DSBs are those whose damaged ends require trimming by Artemis. However, evidence that both ATM and Artemis are specifically required for repair of DSBs in heterochromatin, has called this interpretation into question.

Artemis functions in the repair of DNA double-strand breaks that arise by induced oxidative reactions, or by endogenous reactions. Such DNA repair occurs in heterochromatin as well as in euchromatin.

== Clinical significance ==
Mutations in this gene cause Athabascan-type severe combined immunodeficiency (SCIDA).

== Interactions ==
DCLRE1C has been shown to interact with DNA-PKcs.
