= DNA-PKcs =

Protein found in humans

PRKDC

Identifiers
- Aliases: PRKDC, DNA-PKcs, DNAPK, DNPK1, HYRC, HYRC1, XRCC7, p350, IMD26, protein kinase, DNA-activated, catalytic polypeptide, DNA-PKC, protein kinase, DNA-activated, catalytic subunit, DNAPKc
- External IDs: OMIM: 600899; MGI: 104779; GeneCards: PRKDC
Enzyme activity
EC #	BRENDA	ExPASy	KEGG	MetaCyc
2.7.11.1	↗	↗	↗	↗

Gene location (Human)
Chr.	Chromosome 8 (human)
Band	8q11.21	Start	47,773,111 bp
Band	8q11.21	End	47,960,178 bp

Gene location (Mouse)
Chr.	Chromosome 16 (mouse)
Band	16 10.09 cM|16 A2	Start	15,455,730 bp
Band	16 10.09 cM|16 A2	End	15,660,099 bp
RNA expression pattern
Bgee	Human / Mouse (ortholog); Top expressed in: ventricular zone; stromal cell of endometrium; ganglionic eminence; epithelium of colon; oral cavity; left uterine tube; ectocervix; right ovary; testicle; human penis / Top expressed in: olfactory tubercle; saccule; medullary collecting duct; Paneth cell; cornea; epithelium of lens; lacrimal gland; hair follicle; nucleus accumbens; ureter; More reference expression data
BioGPS	n/a
Gene ontology
Molecular function	transferase activity; nucleotide binding; DNA binding; DNA-dependent protein kinase activity; transcription factor binding; kinase activity; protein serine/threonine kinase activity; protein binding; enzyme binding; ATP binding; RNA binding; double-stranded DNA binding; protein kinase activity; protein domain specific binding
Cellular component	cytosol; membrane; transcription regulator complex; nucleoplasm; DNA-dependent protein kinase-DNA ligase 4 complex; nonhomologous end joining complex; extracellular matrix; nucleus; protein-DNA complex; nucleolus; protein-containing complex
Biological process	somitogenesis; negative regulation of protein phosphorylation; response to ionizing radiation; negative regulation of response to gamma radiation; positive regulation of immune system process; DNA recombination; positive regulation of developmental growth; T cell differentiation in thymus; telomere capping; phosphorylation; rhythmic process; thymus development; positive regulation of fibroblast proliferation; lymphocyte differentiation; T cell receptor V(D)J recombination; negative regulation of apoptotic process; double-strand break repair via alternative nonhomologous end joining; spleen development; negative regulation of immunoglobulin production; response to activity; regulation of smooth muscle cell proliferation; cellular response to DNA damage stimulus; development of the heart; pro-B cell differentiation; brain development; B cell lineage commitment; peptidyl-serine phosphorylation; protein destabilization; regulation of circadian rhythm; intrinsic apoptotic signaling pathway in response to DNA damage; V(D)J recombination; cellular response to insulin stimulus; positive regulation of apoptotic process; ectopic germ cell programmed cell death; immunoglobulin V(D)J recombination; cell population proliferation; double-strand break repair via nonhomologous end joining; telomere maintenance; response to gamma radiation; positive regulation of type I interferon production; T cell lineage commitment; positive regulation of transcription by RNA polymerase II; negative regulation of cellular senescence; immunoglobulin production; double-strand break repair; DNA repair; protein ubiquitination; protein phosphorylation; activation of innate immune response; immune system process; innate immune response; regulation of epithelial cell proliferation; positive regulation of double-strand break repair via nonhomologous end joining
Sources:Amigo / QuickGO
Orthologs
Databases	NCBI: entry; OMA: entry
Species	Human	Mouse
Entrez	5591	19090
Ensembl	ENSG00000253729	ENSMUSG00000022672
UniProt	P78527	P97313
RefSeq (mRNA)	NM_001081640; NM_006904	NM_011159
RefSeq (protein)	NP_001075109; NP_008835	NP_035289
Location (UCSC)	Chr 8: 47.77 – 47.96 Mb	Chr 16: 15.46 – 15.66 Mb
PubMed search
- Wikidata
View/Edit Human	View/Edit Mouse

DNA-dependent protein kinase catalytic subunit, also known as DNA-PKcs, is an enzyme that plays a crucial role in repairing DNA double-strand breaks and has a number of other DNA housekeeping functions. In humans it is encoded by the gene designated as PRKDC or XRCC7. DNA-PKcs belongs to the phosphatidylinositol 3-kinase-related kinase protein family. The DNA-Pkcs protein is a serine/threonine protein kinase consisting of a single polypeptide chain of 4,128 amino acids.

== Function ==
DNA-PKcs is the catalytic subunit of a nuclear DNA-dependent serine/threonine protein kinase called DNA-PK. The second component is the autoimmune antigen Ku. On its own, DNA-PKcs is inactive and relies on Ku to direct it to DNA ends and trigger its kinase activity. DNA-PKcs is required for the non-homologous end joining (NHEJ) pathway of DNA repair, which rejoins double-strand breaks. It is also required for V(D)J recombination, a process that utilizes NHEJ to promote immune system diversity.

Many proteins have been identified as substrates for the kinase activity of DNA-PK. Autophosphorylation of DNA-PKcs appears to play a key role in NHEJ and is thought to induce a conformational change that allows end processing enzymes to access the ends of the double-strand break. DNA-PK also cooperates with ATR and ATM to phosphorylate proteins involved in the DNA damage checkpoint.

=== Disease ===
DNA-PKcs knockout mice have severe combined immunodeficiency due to their V(D)J recombination defect. Natural analogs of this knockout happen in mice, horses and dogs, also causing SCID. Human SCID usually have other causes, but two cases related to mutations in this gene are also known.

=== Apoptosis ===
DNA-PKcs activates p53 to regulate apoptosis. In response to ionizing radiation, DNA-PKcs can serve as an upstream effector for p53 protein activation, thus linking DNA damage to apoptosis. Both repair of DNA damage and apoptosis are catalytic activities required for maintaining integrity of the human genome. Cells that have insufficient DNA repair capability tend to accumulate DNA damages, and when such cells are additionally defective in apoptosis they tend to survive even though excessive DNA damages are present. The replication of DNA in such deficient cells can generate mutations and such mutations may cause cancer. Thus DNA-PKcs appears to have two functions related to the prevention of cancer, where the first function is to participate in the repair of DNA double-strand breaks by the NHEJ repair pathway and the second function is to induce apoptosis if the level of such DNA breaks exceed the cell's repair capability

== Cancer ==
DNA damage appears to be the primary underlying cause of cancer, and deficiencies in DNA repair genes likely underlie many forms of cancer. If DNA repair is deficient, DNA damage tends to accumulate. Such excess DNA damage may increase mutations due to error-prone translesion synthesis. Excess DNA damage may also increase epigenetic alterations due to errors during DNA repair. Such mutations and epigenetic alterations may give rise to cancer.

PRKDC (DNA-PKcs) mutations were found in 3 out of 10 of endometriosis-associated ovarian cancers, as well as in the field defects from which they arose. They were also found in 10% of breast and pancreatic cancers.

Reductions in expression of DNA repair genes (usually caused by epigenetic alterations) are very common in cancers, and are ordinarily even more frequent than mutational defects in DNA repair genes in cancers. DNA-PKcs expression was reduced by 23% to 57% in six cancers as indicated in the table.

Frequency of reduced expression of DNA-PKcs in sporadic cancers
Cancer	Frequency of reduction in cancer	Ref.
Breast cancer	57%	
Prostate cancer	51%	
Cervical carcinoma	32%	
Nasopharyngeal carcinoma	30%	
Epithelial ovarian cancer	29%	
Gastric cancer	23%	

It is not clear what causes reduced expression of DNA-PKcs in cancers. MicroRNA-101 targets DNA-PKcs via binding to the 3'- UTR of DNA-PKcs mRNA and efficiently reduces protein levels of DNA-PKcs. But miR-101 is more often decreased in cancers, rather than increased.

HMGA2 protein could also have an effect on DNA-PKcs. HMGA2 delays the release of DNA-PKcs from sites of double-strand breaks, interfering with DNA repair by non-homologous end joining and causing chromosomal aberrations. The let-7a microRNA normally represses the HMGA2 gene. In normal adult tissues, almost no HMGA2 protein is present. In many cancers, let-7 microRNA is repressed. As an example, in breast cancers the promoter region controlling let-7a-3/let-7b microRNA is frequently repressed by hypermethylation. Epigenetic reduction or absence of let-7a microRNA allows high expression of the HMGA2 protein and this would lead to defective expression of DNA-PKcs.

DNA-PKcs can be up-regulated by stressful conditions such as in Helicobacter pylori-associated gastritis. After ionizing radiation DNA-PKcs was increased in the surviving cells of oral squamous cell carcinoma tissues.

The ATM protein is important in homologous recombinational repair (HRR) of DNA double strand breaks. When cancer cells are deficient in ATM the cells are "addicted" to DNA-PKcs, important in the alternative DNA repair pathway for double-strand breaks, non-homologous end joining (NHEJ). That is, in ATM-mutant cells, an inhibitor of DNA-PKcs causes high levels of apoptotic cell death. In ATM mutant cells, additional loss of DNA-PKcs leaves the cells without either major pathway (HRR and NHEJ) for repair of DNA double-strand breaks.

Elevated DNA-PKcs expression is found in a large fraction (40% to 90%) of some cancers (the remaining fraction of cancers often has reduced or absent expression of DNA-PKcs). The elevation of DNA-PKcs is thought to reflect the induction of a compensatory DNA repair capability, due to the genome instability in these cancers. (As indicated in the article Genome instability, such genome instability may be due to deficiencies in other DNA repair genes present in the cancers.) Elevated DNA-PKcs is thought to be "beneficial to the tumor cells", though it would be at the expense of the patient. As indicated in a table listing 12 types of cancer reported in 20 publications, the fraction of cancers with over-expression of DNA-PKcs is often associated with an advanced stage of the cancer and shorter survival time for the patient. However, the table also indicates that for some cancers, the fraction of cancers with reduced or absent DNA-PKcs is also associated with advanced stage and poor patient survival.

== Aging ==
Non-homologous end joining (NHEJ) is the principal DNA repair process used by mammalian somatic cells to cope with double-strand breaks that continually occur in the genome. DNA-PKcs is one of the key components of the NHEJ machinery. DNA-PKcs deficient mice have a shorter lifespan and show an earlier onset of numerous aging related pathologies than corresponding wild-type littermates. These findings suggest that failure to efficiently repair DNA double-strand breaks results in premature aging, consistent with the DNA damage theory of aging. (See also Bernstein et al.)

== Interactions ==
DNA-PKcs has been shown to interact with:

- ATM,
- C1D, and
- CDC5L,
- CHEK1,
- CHUK,
- CIB1,
- DCLRE1C,
- ILF2,
- ILF3,
- Ku80,
- NCOA6,
- P53,
- RPA2, and
- WRN.

== Inhibitors ==
AZD7648, M3814 (peposertib), M9831 (VX-984) and BAY-8400 have been described as potent and selective DNA-PKcs inhibitors.
