= Monoallelic gene expression =

Monoallelic gene expression (MAE) is the phenomenon of the gene expression, when only one of the two gene copies (alleles) is actively expressed (transcribed), while the other is silent. Diploid organisms bear two homologous copies of each chromosome (one from each parent), a gene can be expressed from both chromosomes (biallelic expression) or from only one (monoallelic expression). MAE can be Random monoallelic expression (RME) or Constitutive monoallelic expression (constitutive). Constitutive monoallelic expression occurs from the same specific allele throughout the whole organism or tissue, as a result of genomic imprinting. RME is a broader class of monoallelic expression, which is defined by random allelic choice in somatic cells, so that different cells of the multi-cellular organism express different alleles.

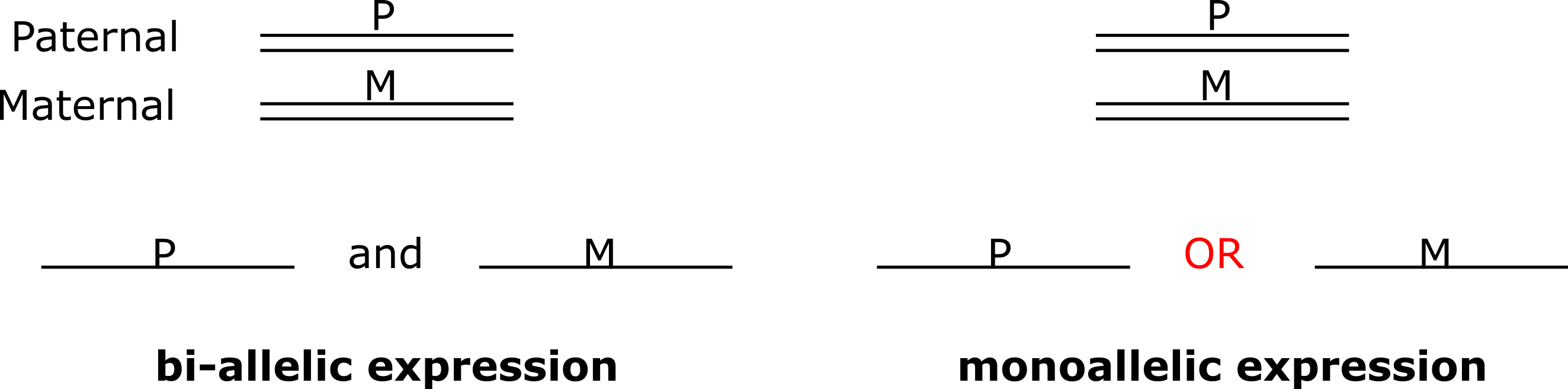
Diagram shows the difference between mono- and bi-allelic expression

== Random monoallelic gene expression (RME) ==
X-chromosome inactivation (XCI), is the most striking and well-studied example of RME. XCI leads to the transcriptional silencing of one of the X chromosomes in female cells, which results in expression of the genes that located on the other, remaining active X chromosome. XCI is critical for balanced gene expression in female mammals. The allelic choice of XCI by individual cells takes place randomly in epiblasts of the preimplantation embryo, which leads to mosaic gene expression of the paternal and maternal X chromosome in female tissues. XCI is a chromosome-wide monoallelic expression, that includes expression of all genes that are located on X chromosome, in contrast to autosomal RME (aRME) that relates to single genes that are interspersed over the genome. aRME's can be fixed or dynamic, depending whether or not the allele-specific expression is conserved in daughter cells after mitotic cell division.

== Types of aRME ==
Fixed aRME are established either by silencing of one allele that previously has been biallelically expressed, or by activation of a single allele from previously silent gene. Expression activation of the silent allele is coupled with a feedback mechanism that prevents expression of the second allele. Another scenario is also possible due to limited time-window of low-probability initiation, that could lead to high frequencies of cells with single-allele expression. It is estimated that 2-10% of all genes are fixed aRME. Studies of fixed aRME require either expansion of monoclonal cultures or lineage-traced in vivo or in vitro cells that are mitotically.

Dynamic aRME occurs as a consequence of stochastic allelic expression. Transcription happens in bursts, which results in RNA molecules being synthesized from each allele separately. So over time, both alleles have a probability to initiate transcription. Transcriptional bursts are allelically stochastic, and lead to either maternal or paternal allele being accumulated in the cell. The gene transcription burst frequency and intensity combined with RNA-degradation rate form the shape of RNA distribution at the moment of observation and thus whether the gene is bi- or monoallelic. Studies that distinguish fixed and dynamic aRME require single-cell analyses of clonally related cells.

== Mechanisms of aRME ==
Allelic exclusion is a process of gene expression when one allele is expressed and the other one kept silent. Two most studied cases of allelic exclusion are monoallelic expression of immunoglobulins in B and T cells and olfactory receptors in sensory neurons. Allelic exclusion is cell-type specific (as opposed to organism-wide XCI), which increases intercellular diversity, thus specificity towards certain antigens or odors.

Allele-biased expression is skewed expression level of one allele over the other, but both alleles are still expressed (in contrast to allelic exclusion). This phenomenon is often observed in cells of immune function

== Methods of detection ==
Methods of MAE detection are based on the difference between alleles, which can be distinguished either by the sequence of expressed mRNA or protein structure. Methods of MAE detection can be divided into single gene or whole genome MAE analysis. Whole genome MAE analysis cannot be performed based on protein structure yet, so these are completely NGS based techniques.

Single-gene analysis

Methods of detection	Synopsis
RT-qPCR	can be used to detect RME by using allele specific primers, SNP-sensitive hybridization probes or allele-specific restriction sites. Can be used for single cells or clonal cell population.
Nascent RNA FISH	visualizes nascent (which is currently being synthesized) RNA in situ. Read-out is one, two or zero fluorescent dots, which indicates mono-, di-allelic or no expression respectfully at single cell resolution.
Cell sorting	if the gene is a surface protein, and there is the allele-specific antibody, this technique can be used to detect presence or absence of fixed or dynamic RME by running the same cell over the time. Single cell resolution.
Live cell imaging	results in expression dynamics over time. Requires the insertion of allele-specific fluorescent protein tag (for example GFP), in order to detect signal.

Genome-wide analysis

Methods of detection	Synopsis
SNP-sensitive microarrays	can be used to give an estimate fixed RME of predefined set of transcripts for clonally expanded cell populations
RNA-seq	similarly to the previous method gives and estimate of fixed RME for clonally expanded cell populations, but for all transcripts.
Single-cell RNA sequencing	similar to the previous methods, but superior. Since, gives an opportunity for single-cell analysis. If multiple clonally related cells are analysed, can distinguish between fixed and dynamic RME's.
