= Microantibody =

A microantibody is an artificial short chain of amino acids copied from a fully functional natural antibody. Microantibodies can stop viruses such as HIV from infecting cells in vitro.

Antibodies are produced naturally by the body and play a key role in fighting infections caused by bacteria and viruses. They can also be used to treat infections by use of injections with blood plasma that contain large amounts of them. The use of whole, natural antibodies as medicines presents many problems: they can only be produced by live cells and this process is difficult to control on an industrial scale, they are large molecules and following administration by injection, they do not diffuse easily from the blood to the tissues and other sites of infections where they are needed.

The use of microantibodies potentially solves these problems. They can be chemically synthesized and their small size allows them to leave the blood circulation quickly and reach the sites of infections in the tissues. They are also poorly immunogenic and do not stimulate an immune response in the host. Production problems remain, but microantibodies have the potential to become an important weapon in the arsenal used to treat infections and other diseases.

== Background ==
Vaccines are used to prevent infections by stimulating the body's own immunity, which includes the production of antibodies that destroy infectious agents such as bacteria and viruses. Some infections can be prevented or treated by antibodies derived from others sources such as blood donations or monoclonal antibodies made in laboratories. This is called passive immunotherapy. However, these treatments have inherent problems; passive antibody exposes the body to foreign protein and although monoclonal antibodies can be humanized they can still invoke an immune response. However, only relatively small regions on antibody molecules are involved in the recognition and inactivation of pathogens. Microantibodies are smaller, synthetic molecules that mimic these regions but do not have the larger regions on antibodies that induce an immune response.

== Prototype ==
A microantibody has been made from a monoclonal antibody produced in mouse cells. This antibody inactivates HIV in vitro.

== See also ==
- Single-domain antibody
