= Quantum Man =

Modern sculpture created by Julian V. Andreae in Washington (state)

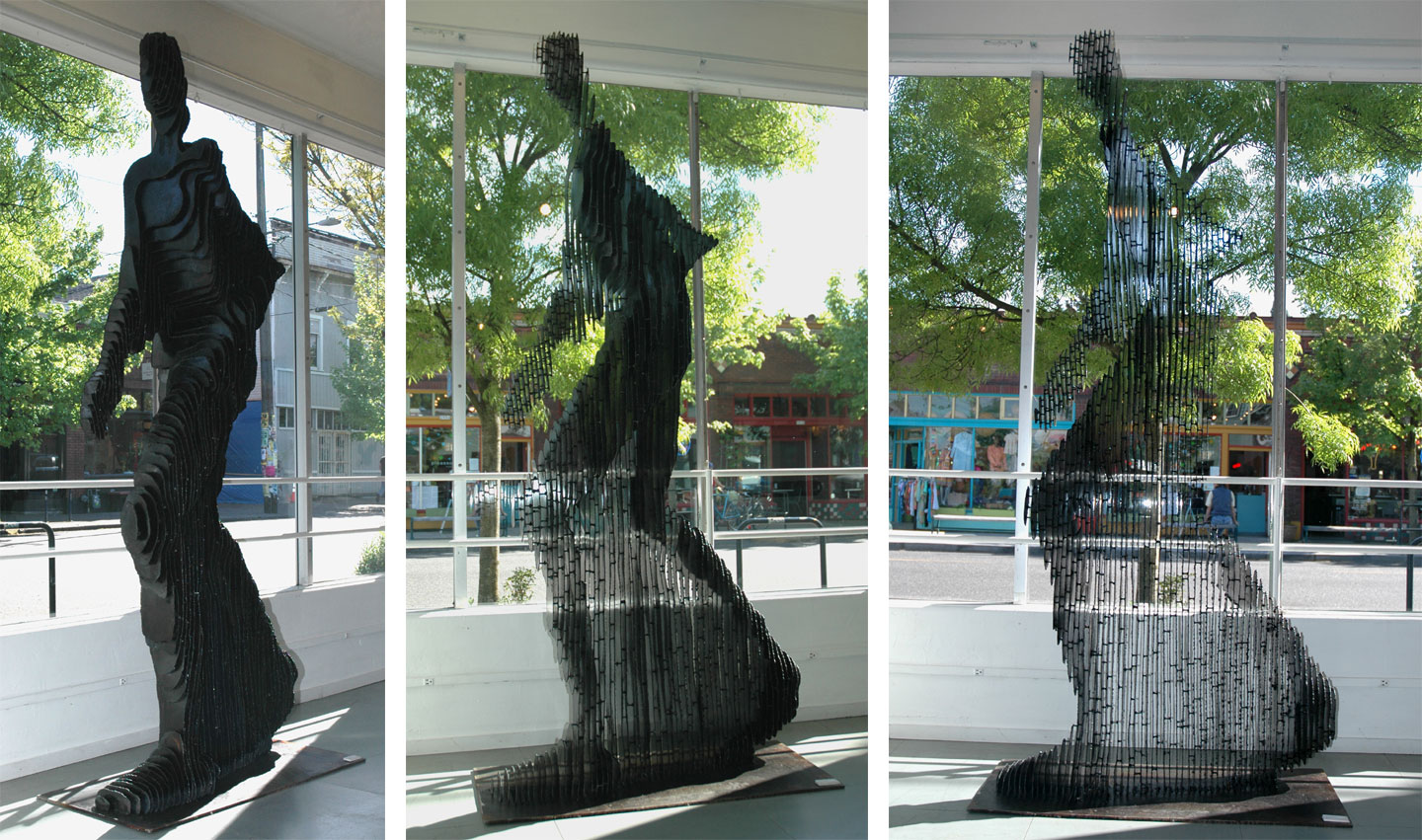
Quantum Man (2006) by Julian Voss-Andreae

Quantum Man is a modern sculpture created by Julian Voss-Andreae, which is located in the city of Moses Lake, Washington.

Drawing inspiration from Voss-Andreae's background in physics, Quantum Man is the image of a walking man seen as a quantum object. Made up of over a hundred vertically oriented steel sheets, the 8′ (2.50 m) tall sculpture provides a metaphor for the counter-intuitive world of quantum physics. Symbolizing the dual nature of matter, the sculpture seems to consist of solid steel when seen from the front but nearly disappears when seen from the side, as light shines through the spaces between the slabs.

In 2007, Voss-Andreae created a second version called Quantum Man 2 in stainless steel.
