= Julian Voss-Andreae =

German sculptor

- Julian Voss-Andreae at the World Quantum Cannes Festival in Cannes, France in 2026
- Born: August 15, 1970 (age 56); Hamburg, Germany
- Education: Free University of Berlin; University of Edinburgh; University of Vienna; Pacific Northwest College of Art
- Known for: Sculpture
- Website: www.julianvossandreae.com

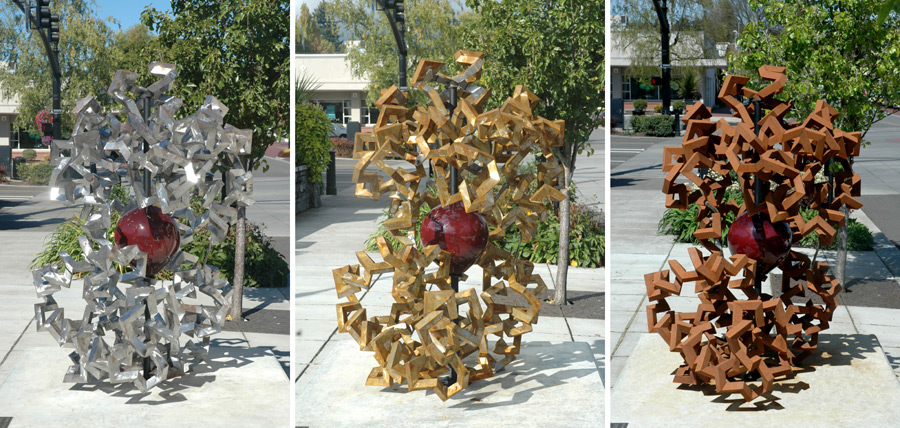
Heart of Steel (Hemoglobin) (2005) by Julian Voss-Andreae. The images show the 5' (1.60 m) tall sculpture right after installation, after 10 days, and after several months of exposure to the elements.

Julian Voss-Andreae (born 15 August 1970) is a German sculptor living and working in the U.S.

== Life ==
Voss-Andreae's full first name is Johann Julian, in honor of his ancestor, German pastor Johann Valentin Andreae. According to an interview with the artist, Voss-Andreae attended a Rudolf Steiner school in Germany from grades 9 to 13.

Voss-Andreae was born in Hamburg, Germany (formerly West Germany) and started out as a painter. He later studied experimental physics at the universities of Berlin, Edinburgh and Vienna. Voss-Andreae pursued his graduate research in quantum physics in Anton Zeilinger's research group, participating in an experiment demonstrating quantum behavior for the largest objects to date. He moved to the U.S. in 2000 and graduated from the Pacific Northwest College of Art in 2004.

Voss-Andreae's work is heavily influenced by his background in science. His work includes protein sculptures, such as Angel of the West (2008), a large-scale outdoor sculpture for the Scripps Research Institute in Jupiter, Florida portraying the human antibody molecule, a sculpture for Nobel laureate Roderick MacKinnon based on the ion channel structure, and the quantum physics-inspired Quantum Man (2006).

Recent work includes an exhibition at the American Center for Physics displaying a series of sculptures inspired by concepts from quantum physics.

In 2020 he was awarded the Waltrude-and-Friedrich-Liebau-prize for the Promotion of Interdisciplinarity in Crystallography by the German Crystallographic Society.

== Gallery ==
Various sculptures of Julian Voss-Andreae featuring proteins structure.

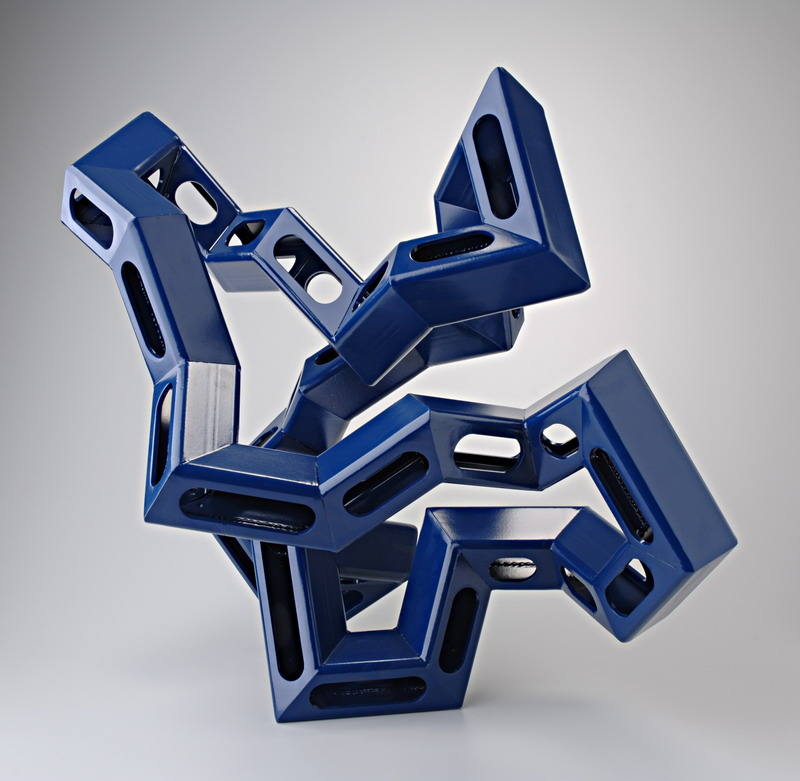
Cycloviolacin, sculpture of cycloviolacin

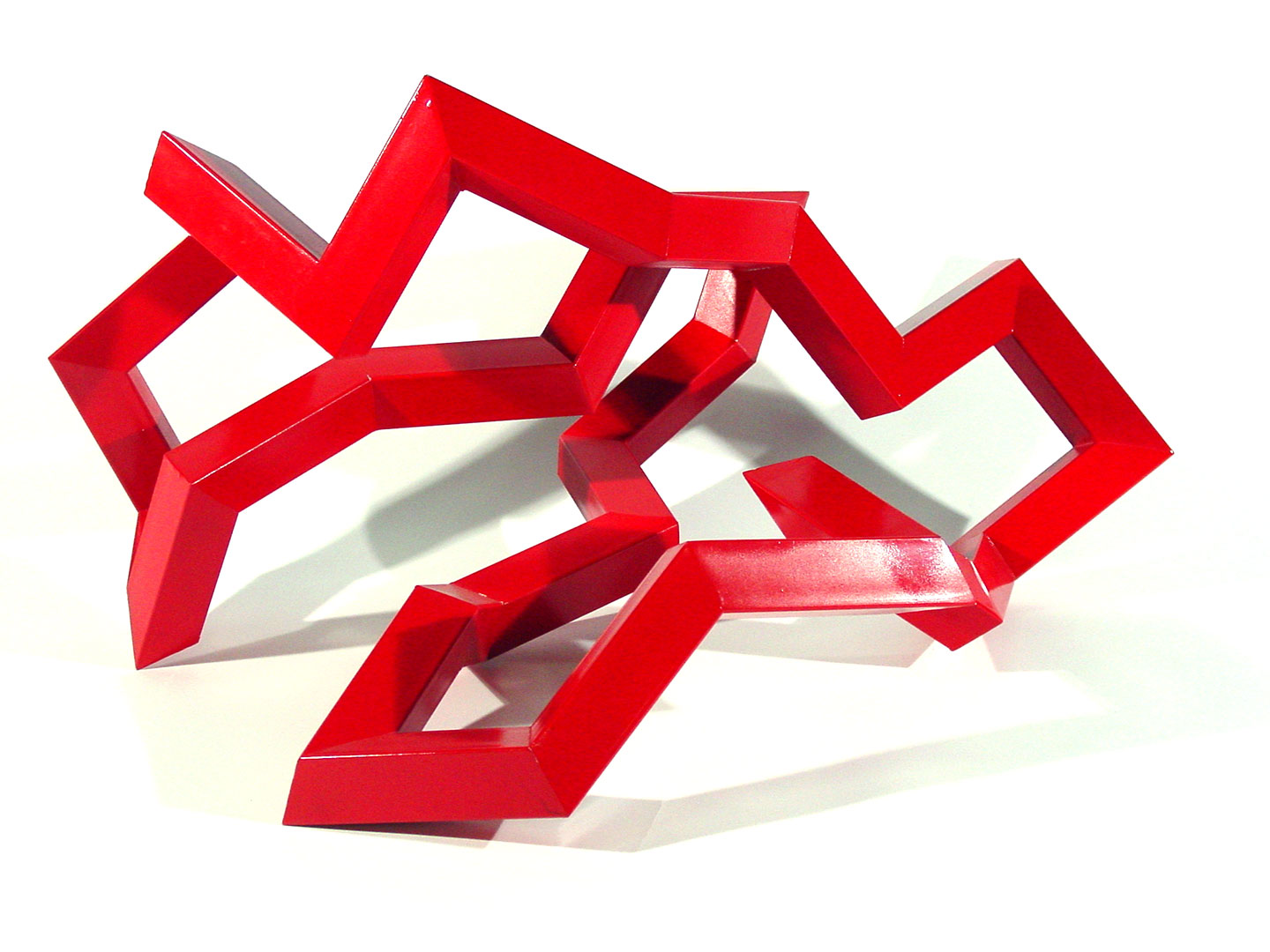
Kalata, sculpture of the cyclotide kalata B1

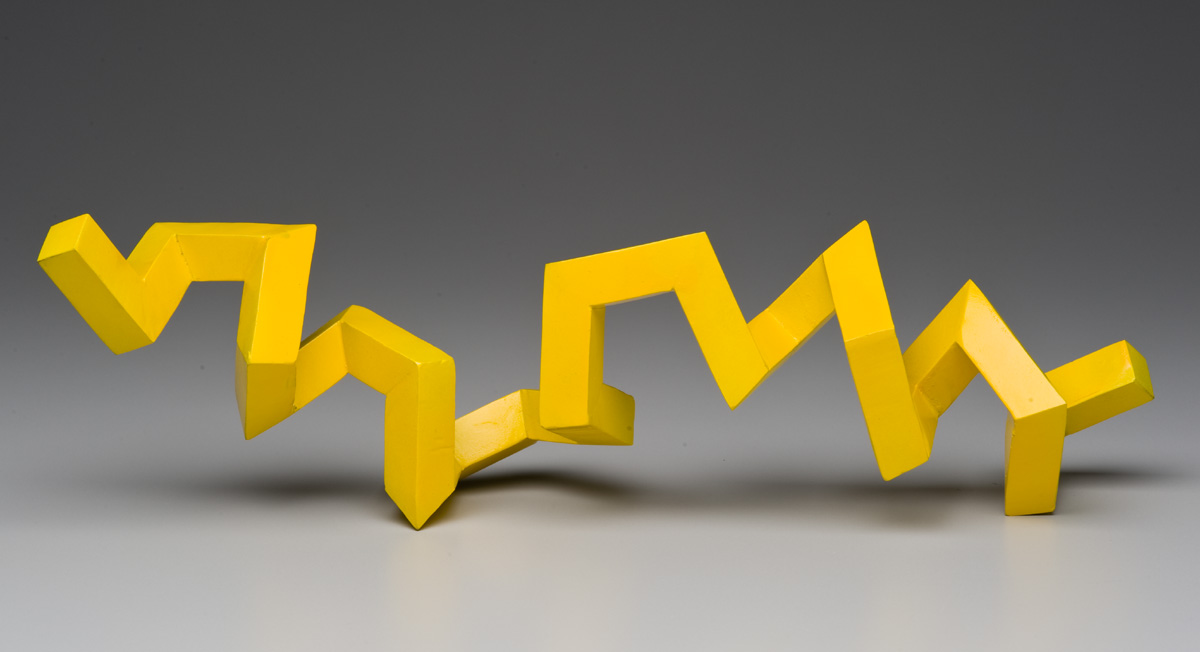
Melittin, sculpture of melittin

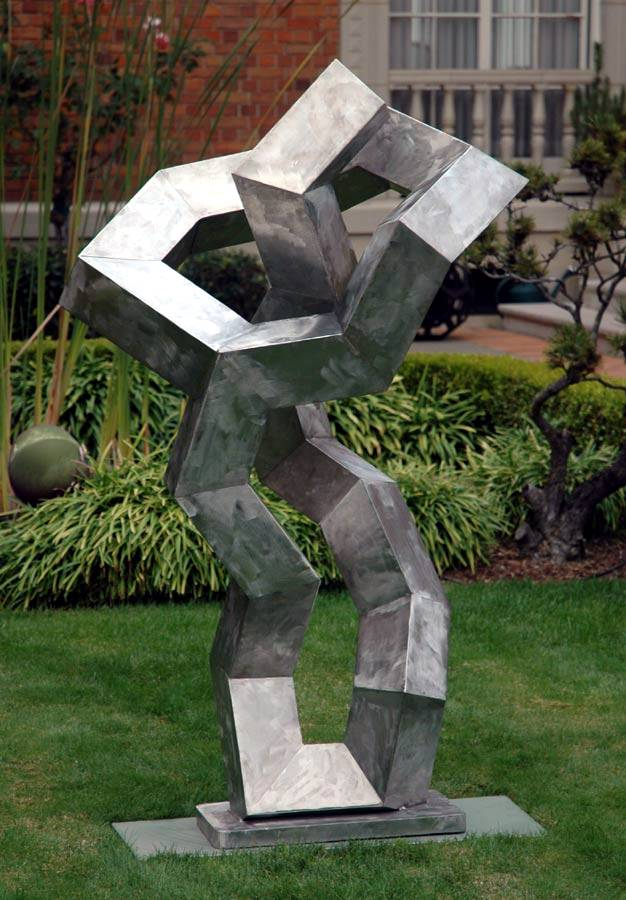
Nanos, sculpture of microcin J25

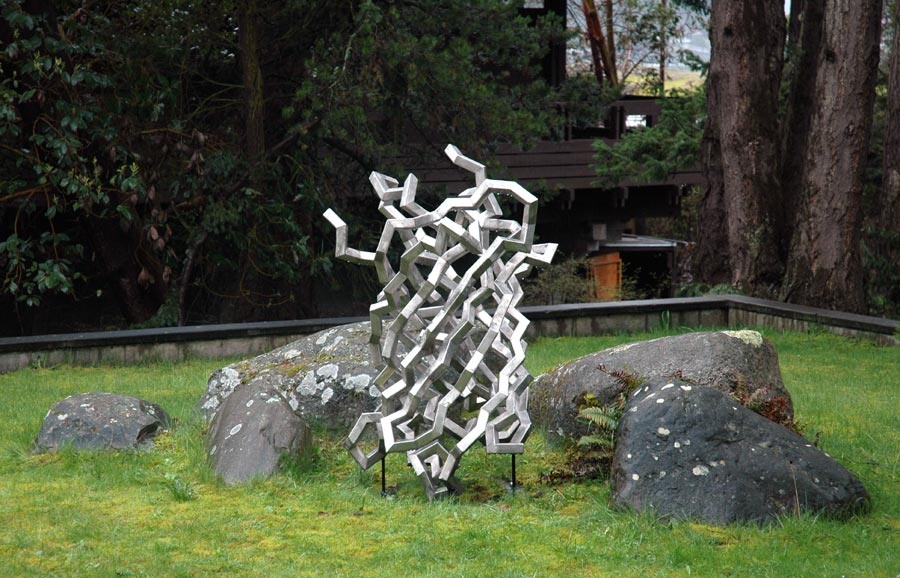
Steel Jellyfish, sculpture of green fluorescent protein

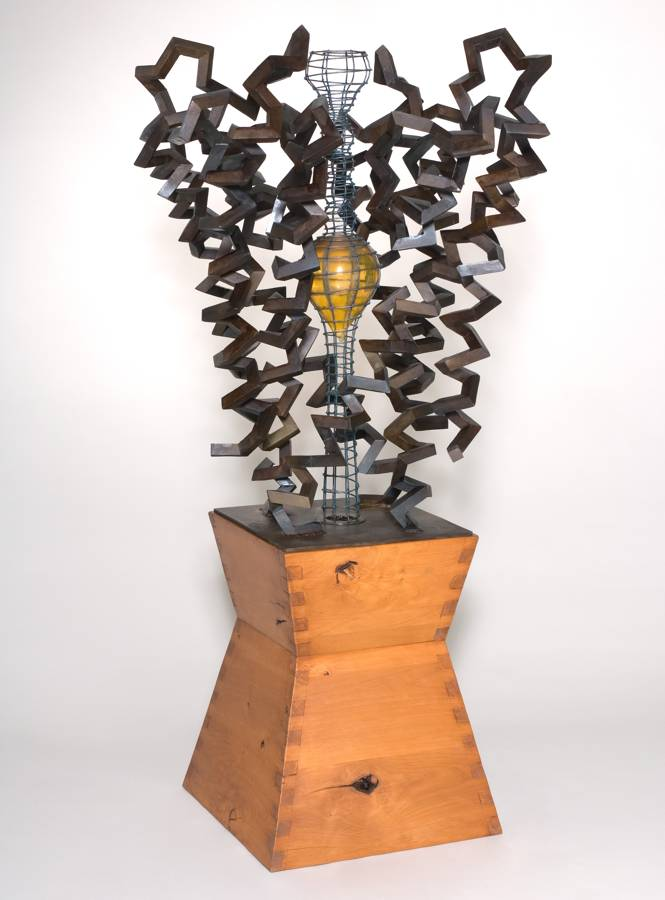
Birth of an Idea, sculpture of KcsA potassium channel

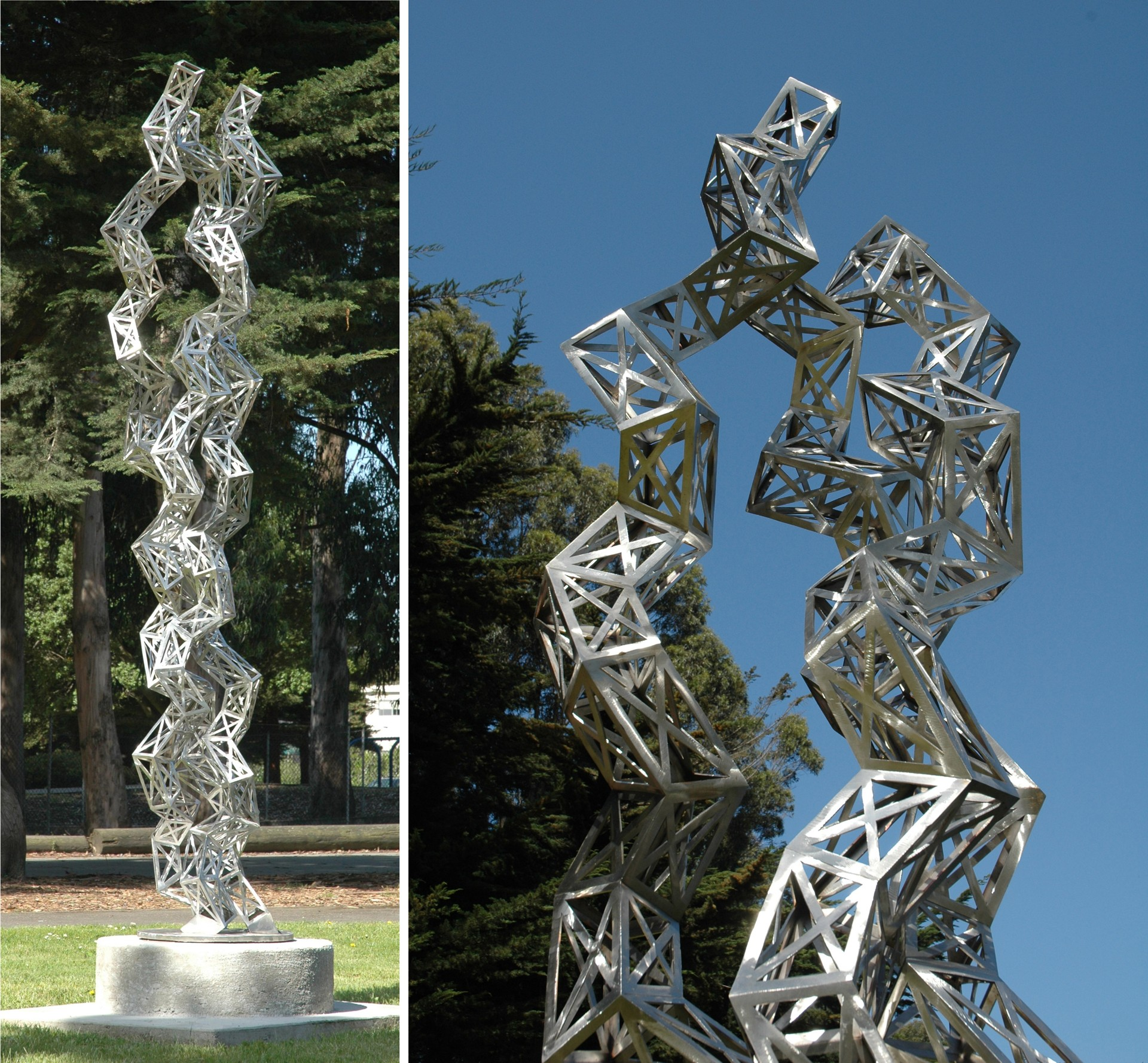
Unraveling Collagen, sculpture of collagen

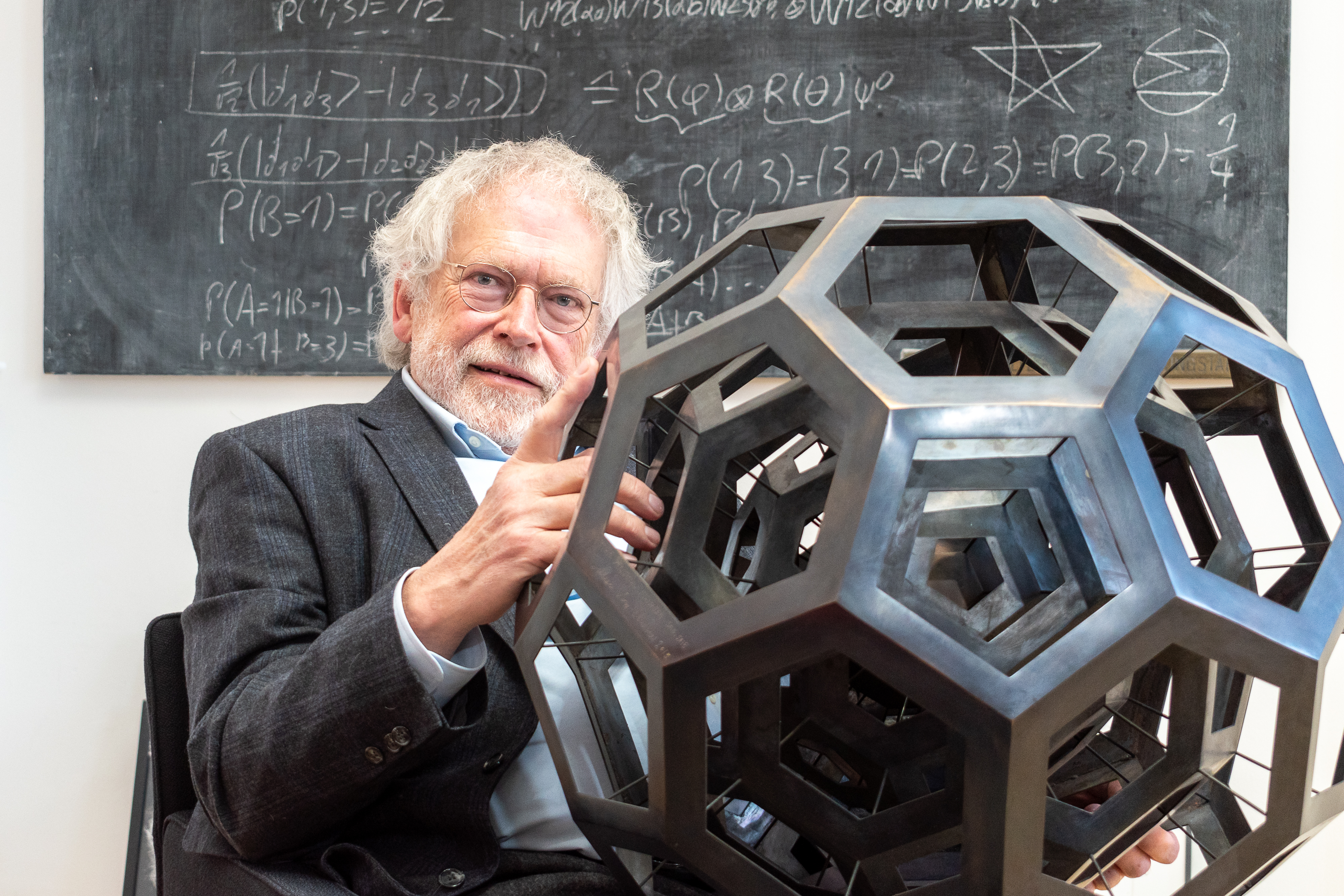
Buckyballs, sculpture of buckyballs (held by Anton Zeilinger)

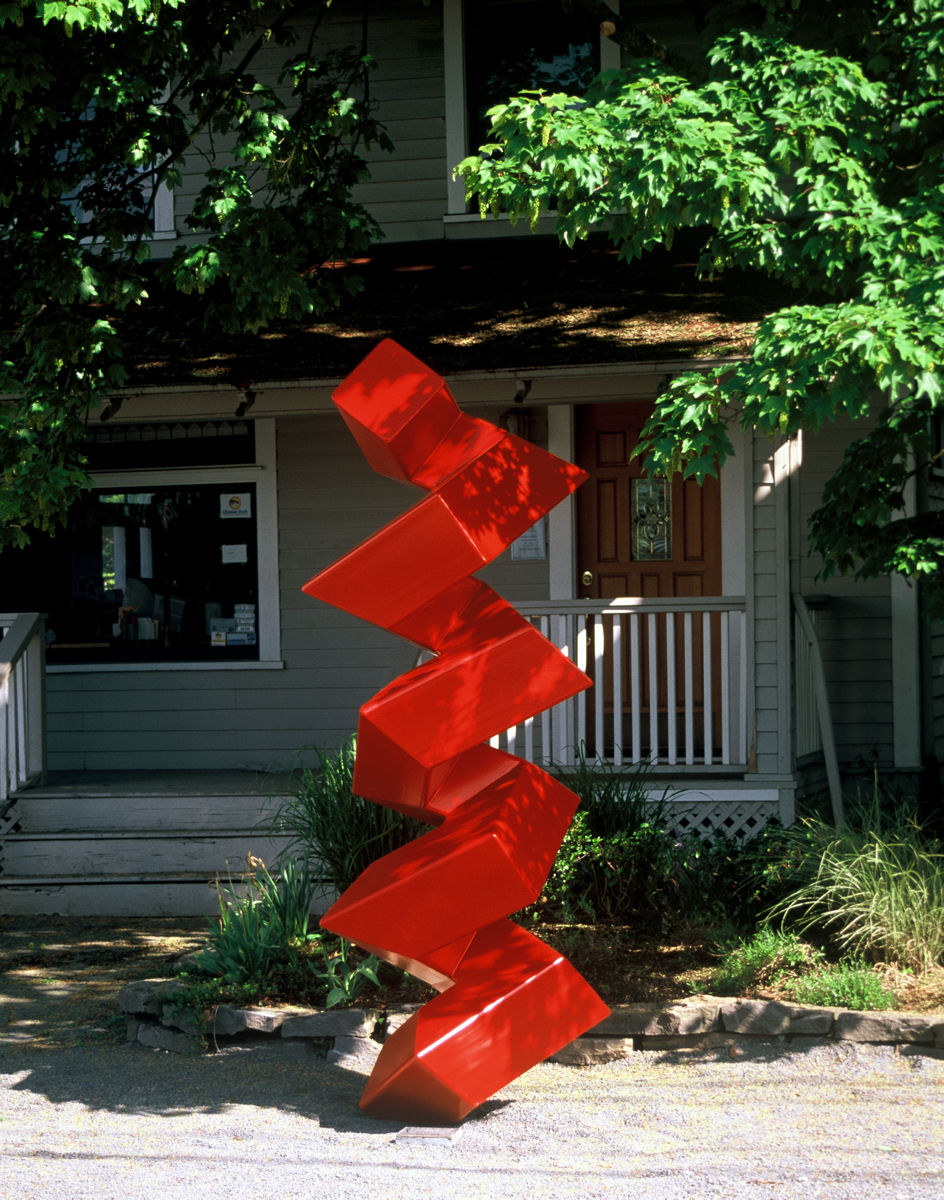
Alpha Helix For Linus Pauling, sculpture of an alpha helix

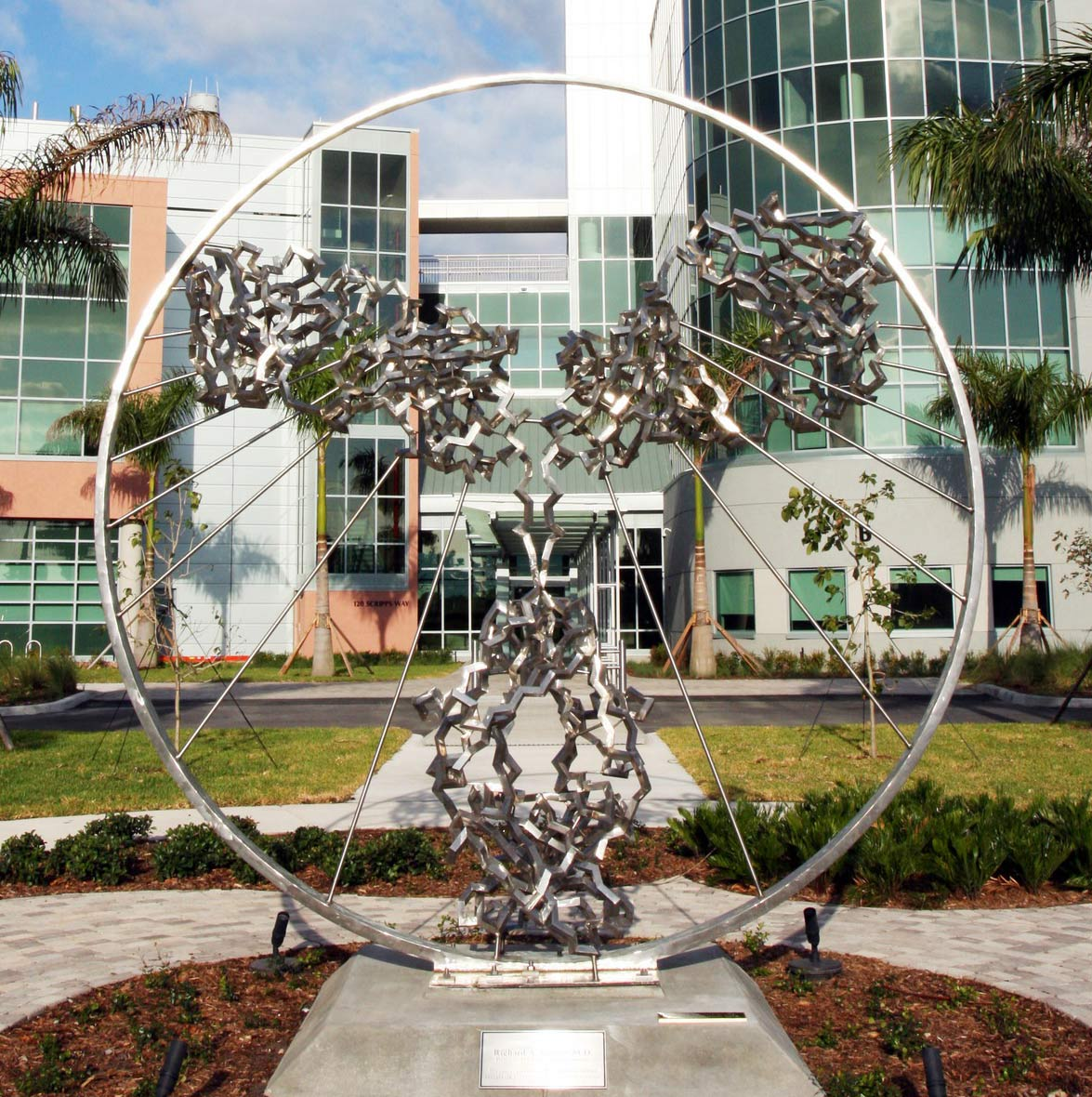
Angel of the West, symbolic sculpture of an antibody referring to Vitruvian Man
