= Surrobody =

Type of proteins

Based upon the pre-B cell receptor (pre-BCR), surrobodies are non-naturally occurring, antibody-like proteins with high affinity to their antigen. The trimeric pre-BCR composes an antibody heavy chain paired with two surrogate light chain components. They have been generated for both therapeutic and research applications.

Xu et al have generated combinatorial libraries based on these pre-BCR proteins in which diverse heavy chains are paired with a fixed surrogate light chain components. These libraries have been expressed in mammalian, Escherichia coli, and phagemid systems to generate proteins with high affinity to their target.

Surrobodies have been patented by Sea Lane Biotechnologies in 2012.
