= Angel of the West =

Outdoor sculpture in Jupiter, Florida since 2008

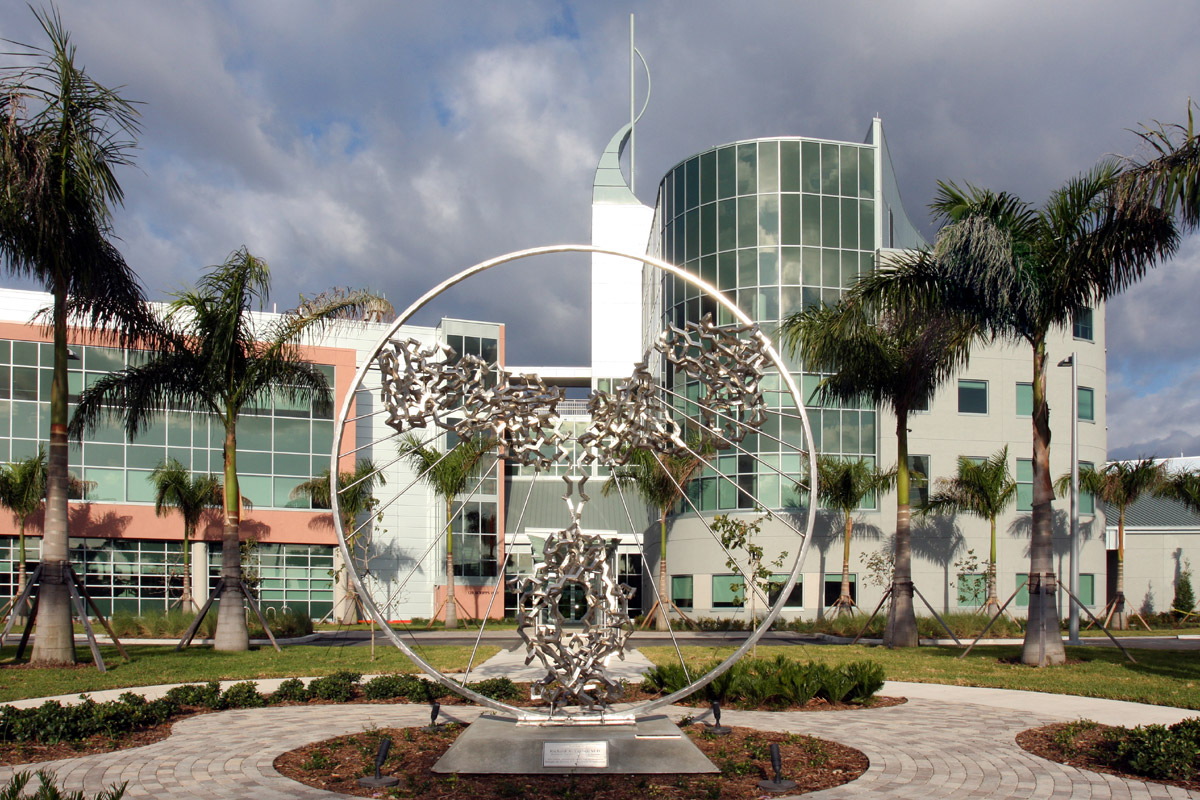

- Location within Florida
- Artist: Julian Voss-Andreae
- Year: 2008
- Type: Stainless steel
- Dimensions: 3.7 m × 3.7 m × 1.2 m (12 ft × 12 ft × 4 ft)
- Location: Jupiter, Florida, United States; 26.885207°N 80.112226°W
- Owner: The Scripps Research Institute

Angel of the West is an outdoor sculpture in Jupiter, Florida, United States. The sculpture was made in 2008 by German sculptor Julian Voss-Andreae. Referencing British sculptor Antony Gormley's monumental 1998 piece Angel of the North it was created based on an antibody structure published by E. Padlan for the Florida campus of the Scripps Research Institute. The antibody is placed into a ring referencing Leonardo da Vinci's Vitruvian Man highlighting the similar proportions of the antibody and the human body.

== See also ==
- Angel of the North
- White Horse at Ebbsfleet, sometimes called "The Angel of The South".
