= Astrid Fagraeus =

Swedish immunologist

- Born: 30 May 1913
- Died: 24 February 1997 (aged 83)

Academic work
- Discipline: Immunologist
- Notable works: Antibody Production in relation to the Development of Plasma Cells

Astrid Elsa Fagraeus-Wallbom (30 May 1913 – 24 February 1997) was a Swedish immunologist.

== Education and career ==
Fagraeus was born in Stockholm, Sweden. She received a PhD in medicine in 1948 from the Karolinska Institute. In 1949, she was appointed associate professor of bacteriology at Karolinska Institutet in Stockholm. She became head of the virology department at the Swedish Bacteriological Laboratory in 1953. In 1961–1979 she served as the first professor of immunology in Sweden, at Karolinska Institutet.

== Scientific work ==
Fagraeus' doctoral dissertation, Antibody Production in Relation to the Development of Plasma Cells, attracted international attention and was considered a milestone in modern immunology. In this work, she was the first to show that plasma cells produce antibodies (IgG). Until then, their function was unknown. During her career, she published around 80 scientific publications, and she was particularly focused on the development and maturation of T lymphocytes in the thymus. Among Fagraeus' later contributions was her role in the development of a Swedish polio vaccine, together with Professor Sven Gard.

== Awards and honors ==
The work in her PhD dissertation led to the Swedish Medical Society's 'Jubilee Prize' in 1950. The American Association of Immunologists appointed Astrid Fagraeus an honorary member in 1973. A research building at Karolinska Institutet is named after Astrid Fagraeus.

== Personal life ==
Fagraeus was the daughter of Consul General Isidor Fagraeus and Elsa Bäckström. She married in 1955 the director Sven Wallbom and had the children Kerstin (born 1955) and Ann (born 1956). She is buried at Norra cemetery in Solna.
