= Proteinopathy =

Diseases caused by abnormal protein structure

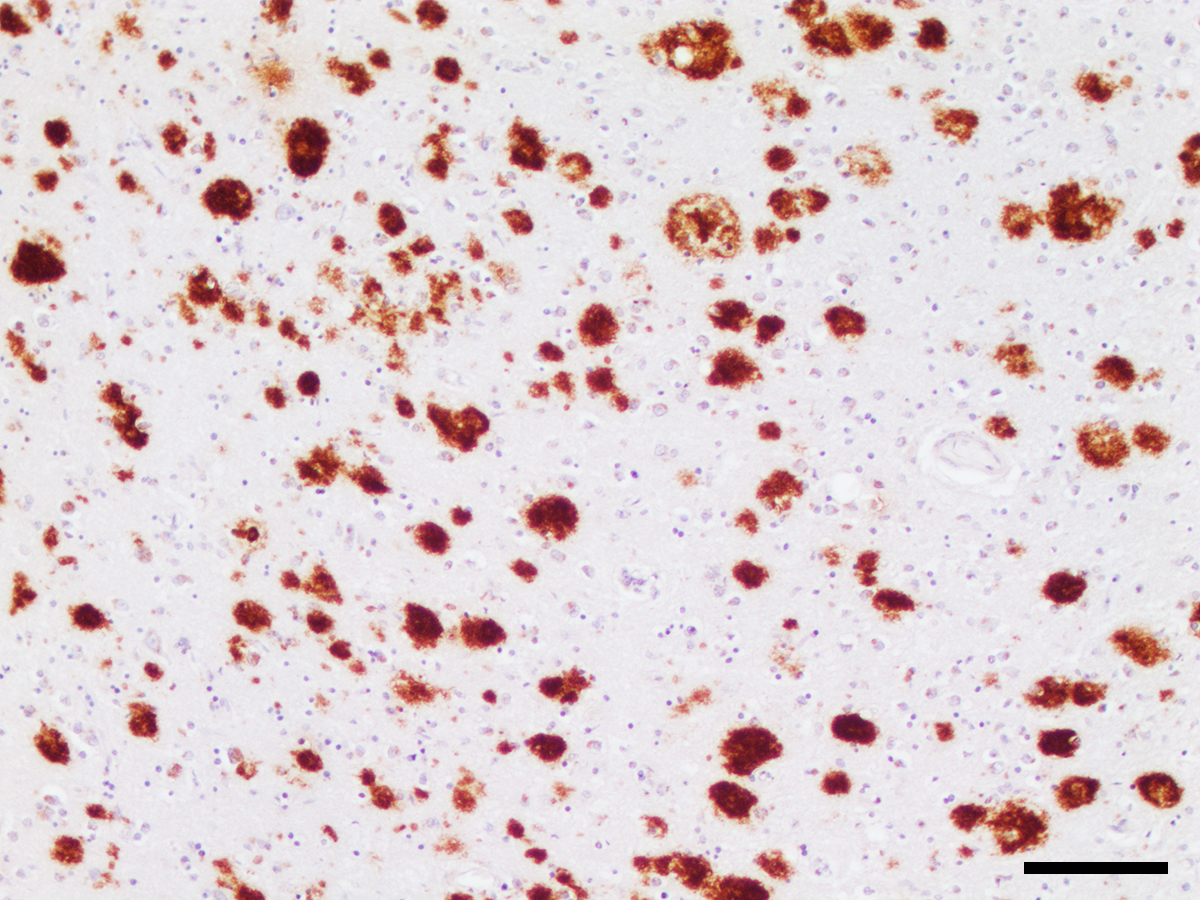
- Abeta protein deposits (brown) in the cerebral cortex of a person who died with Alzheimer's disease; Nissl counterstain (blue). 10X microscope objective; the scale bar=100 microns (0.1 mm).

A proteinopathy ([pref. protein]; -pathy [suff. disease]; proteinopathies pl.; proteinopathic adj), or proteopathy, protein conformational disorder, or protein misfolding disease, is a class of diseases in which certain proteins become misfolded. The structurally abnormal proteins disrupt the function of cells in tissues and organs.

Often the proteins fail to fold into their normal configuration; in this misfolded state, the proteins can become toxic in some way (a toxic gain-of-function) or they can lose their normal function. The proteinopathies include such diseases as Creutzfeldt–Jakob disease, vCJD and other prion diseases, Alzheimer's disease, Parkinson's disease, amyloidosis, multiple system atrophy, and a wide range of other disorders. The term proteopathy was first proposed in 2000 by Lary Walker and Harry LeVine.

The concept of proteopathy can trace its origins to the mid-19th century, when, in 1854, Rudolf Virchow coined the term amyloid ("starch-like") to describe a substance in cerebral corpora amylacea that exhibited a chemical reaction resembling that of cellulose. In 1859, Friedreich and Kekulé demonstrated that, rather than consisting of cellulose, "amyloid" actually is rich in protein. Subsequent research has shown that many different proteins can form amyloid, and that all amyloids show birefringence in cross-polarized light after staining with the dye Congo red, as well as a fibrillar ultrastructure when viewed with an electron microscope. However, some proteinaceous lesions lack birefringence and contain few or no classical amyloid fibrils, such as the diffuse deposits of amyloid beta (Aβ) protein in the brains of people with Alzheimer's. Furthermore, evidence has emerged that small, non-fibrillar protein aggregates known as oligomers are toxic to the cells of an affected organ, and that amyloidogenic proteins in their fibrillar form may be relatively benign.

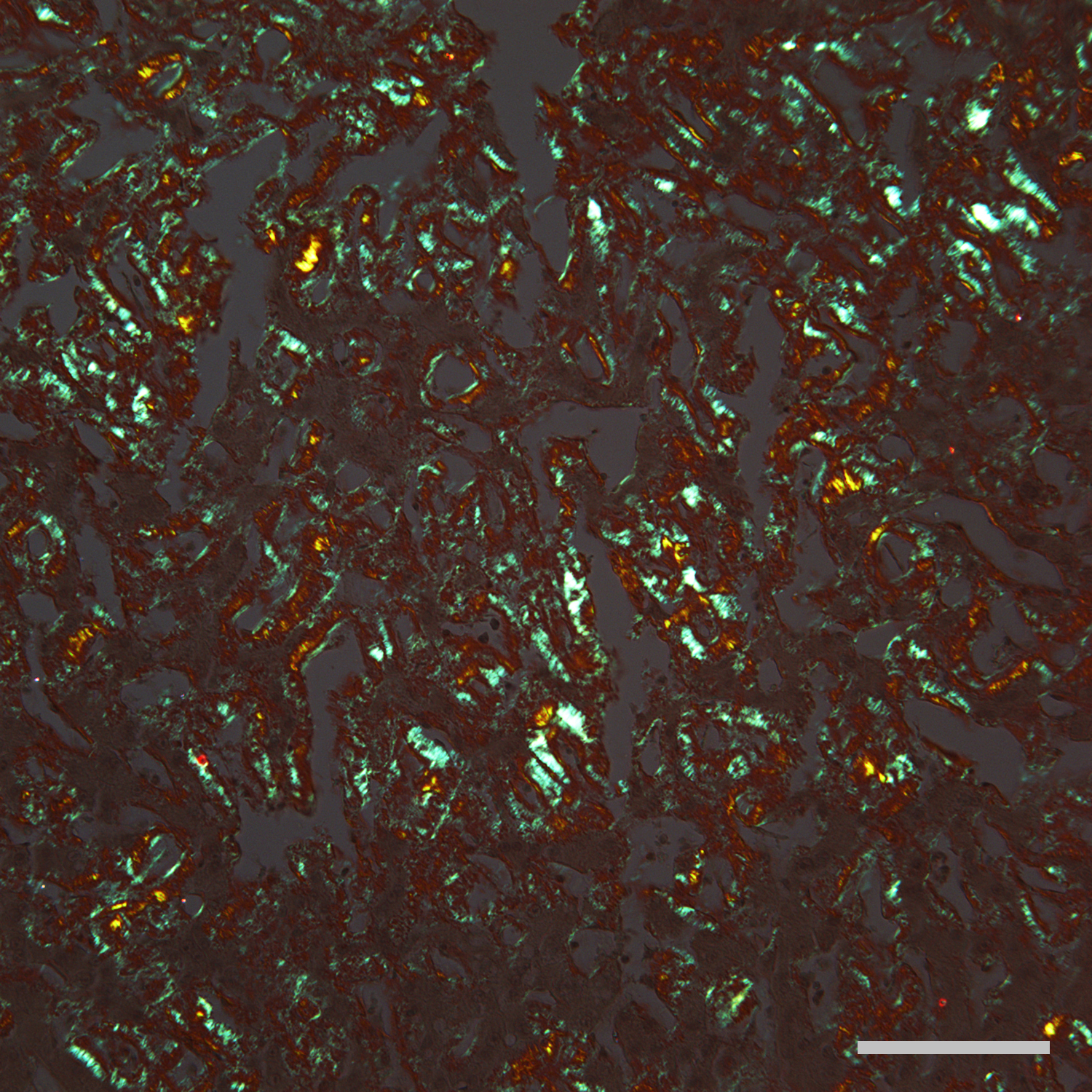
Micrograph of amyloid in a section of liver that has been stained with the dye Congo red and viewed with crossed polarizing filters, yielding a typical orange-greenish birefringence. 20X microscope objective; the scale bar=100 microns (0.1mm).

== Pathophysiology ==
In most, if not all proteinopathies, a change in the 3-dimensional folding conformation increases the tendency of a specific protein to bind to itself. In this aggregated form, the protein is resistant to clearance and can interfere with the normal capacity of the affected organs. In some cases, misfolding of the protein results in a loss of its usual function. For example, cystic fibrosis is caused by a defective cystic fibrosis transmembrane conductance regulator (CFTR) protein, and in amyotrophic lateral sclerosis / frontotemporal lobar degeneration (FTLD), certain gene-regulating proteins inappropriately aggregate in the cytoplasm, and thus are unable to perform their normal tasks within the nucleus.

Because proteins share a common structural feature known as the polypeptide backbone, all proteins have the potential to misfold under some circumstances. However, only a relatively small number of proteins are linked to proteopathic disorders, possibly due to structural idiosyncrasies of the vulnerable proteins. For example, proteins that are normally unfolded or relatively unstable as monomers (that is, as single, unbound protein molecules) are more likely to misfold into an abnormal conformation. In nearly all instances, the disease-causing molecular configuration involves an increase in beta-sheet secondary structure of the protein.

The abnormal proteins in some proteopathies have been shown to fold into multiple 3-dimensional shapes; these variant, proteinaceous structures are defined by their different pathogenic, biochemical, and conformational properties. They have been most thoroughly studied with regard to prion disease, and are referred to as protein strains.

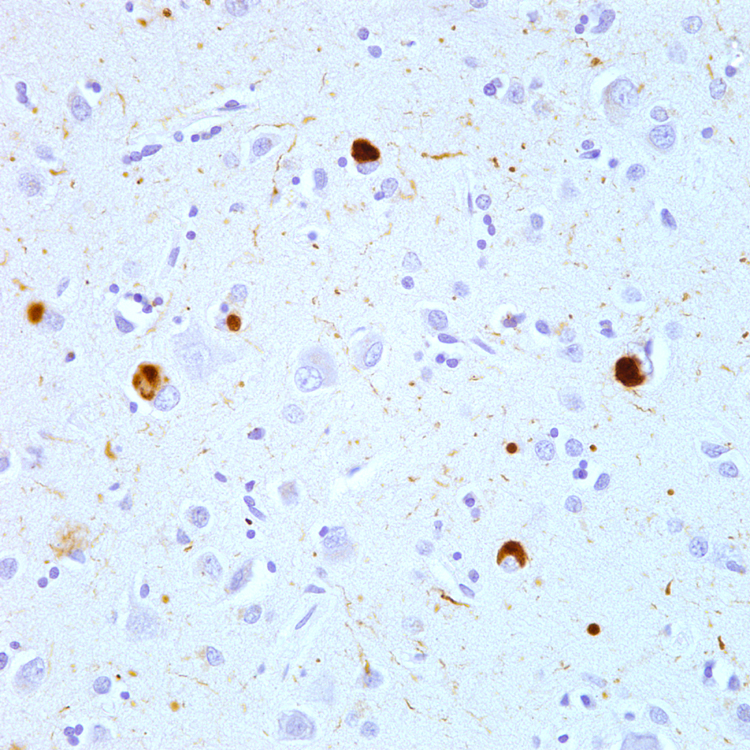
Micrograph of immunostained α-synuclein (brown) in Lewy bodies (large clumps) and Lewy neurites (thread-like structures) in the cerebral cortex of a patient with Lewy body disease, a synucleinopathy. 40X microscope objective.

The likelihood that proteinopathy will develop is increased by certain risk factors that promote the self-assembly of a protein. These include destabilizing changes in the primary amino acid sequence of the protein, post-translational modifications (such as hyperphosphorylation), changes in temperature or pH, an increase in production of a protein, or a decrease in its clearance. Advancing age is a strong risk factor, as is traumatic brain injury. In the aging brain, multiple proteopathies can overlap. For example, in addition to tauopathy and Aβ-amyloidosis (which coexist as key pathologic features of Alzheimer's disease), many Alzheimer patients have concomitant synucleinopathy (Lewy bodies) in the brain.

It is hypothesized that chaperones and co-chaperones (proteins that assist protein folding) may antagonize proteotoxicity during aging and in protein misfolding-diseases to maintain proteostasis.

== Seeded induction ==
Some proteins can be induced to form abnormal assemblies by exposure to the same (or similar) protein that has folded into a disease-causing conformation, a process called 'seeding' or 'permissive templating'. In this way, the disease state can be brought about in a susceptible host by the introduction of diseased tissue extract from an affected donor. The best known forms of inducible proteopathy are prion diseases, which can be transmitted by exposure of a host organism to purified prion protein in a disease-causing conformation.

There is now evidence that other proteinopathies can be induced by a similar mechanism, including Aβ amyloidosis, amyloid A (AA) amyloidosis, and apolipoprotein AII amyloidosis, tauopathy, synucleinopathy, and the aggregation of superoxide dismutase-1 (SOD1), polyglutamine, and TAR DNA-binding protein-43 (TDP-43).

In all of these instances, an aberrant form of the protein itself appears to be the pathogenic agent. In some cases, the deposition of one type of protein can be experimentally induced by aggregated assemblies of other proteins that are rich in β-sheet structure, possibly because of structural complementarity of the protein molecules. For example, AA amyloidosis can be stimulated in mice by such diverse macromolecules as silk, the yeast amyloid Sup35, and curli fibrils from the bacterium Escherichia coli. AII amyloid can be induced in mice by a variety of β-sheet rich amyloid fibrils, and cerebral tauopathy can be induced by brain extracts that are rich in aggregated Aβ. There is also experimental evidence for cross-seeding between prion protein and Aβ. In general, such heterologous seeding is less efficient than is seeding by a corrupted form of the same protein.

== List of proteinopathies ==
Proteinopathy	Major aggregating protein
Alzheimer's disease	Amyloid β peptide (Aβ); Tau protein (see tauopathies)
Cerebral β-amyloid angiopathy	Amyloid β peptide (Aβ)
Retinal ganglion cell degeneration in glaucoma	Amyloid β peptide (Aβ)
Prion diseases (multiple)	Prion protein
Parkinson's disease and other synucleinopathies (multiple)	α-Synuclein
Tauopathies (multiple)	Microtubule-associated protein tau (Tau protein)
Frontotemporal lobar degeneration (FTLD) (Ubi+, Tau-)	TDP-43
FTLD–FUS	Fused in sarcoma (FUS) protein
FTLD-TAF15	TATA-binding protein-associated factor 15 (TAF15)
Amyotrophic lateral sclerosis (ALS)	Superoxide dismutase, TDP-43, FUS, C9ORF72, ubiquilin-2 (UBQLN2)
Huntington's disease and other trinucleotide repeat disorders (multiple)	Proteins with tandem glutamine expansions
Familial British dementia	ABri
Familial Danish dementia	ADan
Hereditary cerebral hemorrhage with amyloidosis (Icelandic) (HCHWA-I)	Cystatin C
CADASIL	Notch3
Alexander disease	Glial fibrillary acidic protein (GFAP)
Pelizaeus-Merzbacher disease	Proteolipid protein (PLP)
Seipinopathies	Seipin
Familial amyloidotic neuropathy, Senile systemic amyloidosis	Transthyretin
Serpinopathies (multiple)	Serpins
AL (light chain) amyloidosis (primary systemic amyloidosis)	Monoclonal immunoglobulin light chains
AH (heavy chain) amyloidosis	Immunoglobulin heavy chains
AA (secondary) amyloidosis	Amyloid A protein
Type II diabetes	Islet amyloid polypeptide (IAPP; amylin)
Aortic medial amyloidosis	Medin (lactadherin)
ApoAI amyloidosis	Apolipoprotein AI
ApoAII amyloidosis	Apolipoprotein AII
ApoAIV amyloidosis	Apolipoprotein AIV
Familial amyloidosis of the Finnish type (FAF)	Gelsolin
Lysozyme amyloidosis	Lysozyme
Fibrinogen amyloidosis	Fibrinogen
Dialysis amyloidosis	Beta-2 microglobulin
Inclusion body myositis/myopathy	Amyloid β peptide (Aβ)
Cataracts	Crystallins
Retinitis pigmentosa with rhodopsin mutations	rhodopsin
Medullary thyroid carcinoma	Calcitonin
Cardiac atrial amyloidosis	Atrial natriuretic factor
Pituitary prolactinoma	Prolactin
Hereditary lattice corneal dystrophy	Keratoepithelin
Cutaneous lichen amyloidosis	Keratins
Mallory bodies	Keratin intermediate filament proteins
Corneal lactoferrin amyloidosis	Lactoferrin
Pulmonary alveolar proteinosis	Surfactant protein C (SP-C)
Odontogenic (Pindborg) tumor amyloid	Odontogenic ameloblast-associated protein
Seminal vesicle amyloid	Semenogelin I
Apolipoprotein C2 amyloidosis	Apolipoprotein C2 (ApoC2)
Apolipoprotein C3 amyloidosis	Apolipoprotein C3 (ApoC3)
Lect2 amyloidosis	Leukocyte chemotactic factor-2 (Lect2)
Insulin amyloidosis	Insulin
Galectin-7 amyloidosis (primary localized cutaneous amyloidosis)	Galectin-7 (Gal7)
Corneodesmosin amyloidosis	Corneodesmosin
Enfuvirtide amyloidosis	Enfuvirtide
Cystic fibrosis	Cystic fibrosis transmembrane conductance regulator (CFTR) protein
Sickle cell disease	Hemoglobin
Plasma cell dyscrasias (monoclonal gammopathies)	Gamma globulin
Exfoliation syndrome aka pseudoexfoliation syndrome	Aggregated fibrillar material (esp. LOXL1)
Biondi bodies in choroid plexus	TMEM106B

== Management ==
The development of effective treatments for many proteopathies has been challenging. Because the proteopathies often involve different proteins arising from different sources, treatment strategies must be customized to each disorder; however, general therapeutic approaches include maintaining the function of affected organs, reducing the formation of the disease-causing proteins, preventing the proteins from misfolding and/or aggregating, or promoting their removal. For example, in Alzheimer's disease, researchers are seeking ways to reduce the production of the disease-associated protein Aβ by inhibiting the enzymes that free it from its parent protein. Another strategy is to use antibodies to neutralize specific proteins by active or passive immunization. In some proteopathies, inhibiting the toxic effects of protein oligomers might be beneficial.

For example, Amyloid A (AA) amyloidosis can be reduced by treating the inflammatory state that increases the amount of the protein in the blood (referred to as serum amyloid A, or SAA). In immunoglobulin light chain amyloidosis (AL amyloidosis), chemotherapy can be used to lower the number of the blood cells that make the light chain protein that forms amyloid in various bodily organs. Transthyretin (TTR) amyloidosis (ATTR) results from the deposition of misfolded TTR in multiple organs. Because TTR is mainly produced in the liver, TTR amyloidosis can be slowed in some hereditary cases by liver transplantation. TTR amyloidosis also can be treated by stabilizing the normal assemblies of the protein (called tetramers because they consist of four TTR molecules bound together). Stabilization prevents individual TTR molecules from escaping, misfolding, and aggregating into amyloid.

Several other treatment strategies for proteopathies are being investigated, including small molecules and biologic medicines such as small interfering RNAs, antisense oligonucleotides, peptides, and engineered immune cells. In some cases, multiple therapeutic agents may be combined to improve effectiveness.

== Additional images ==
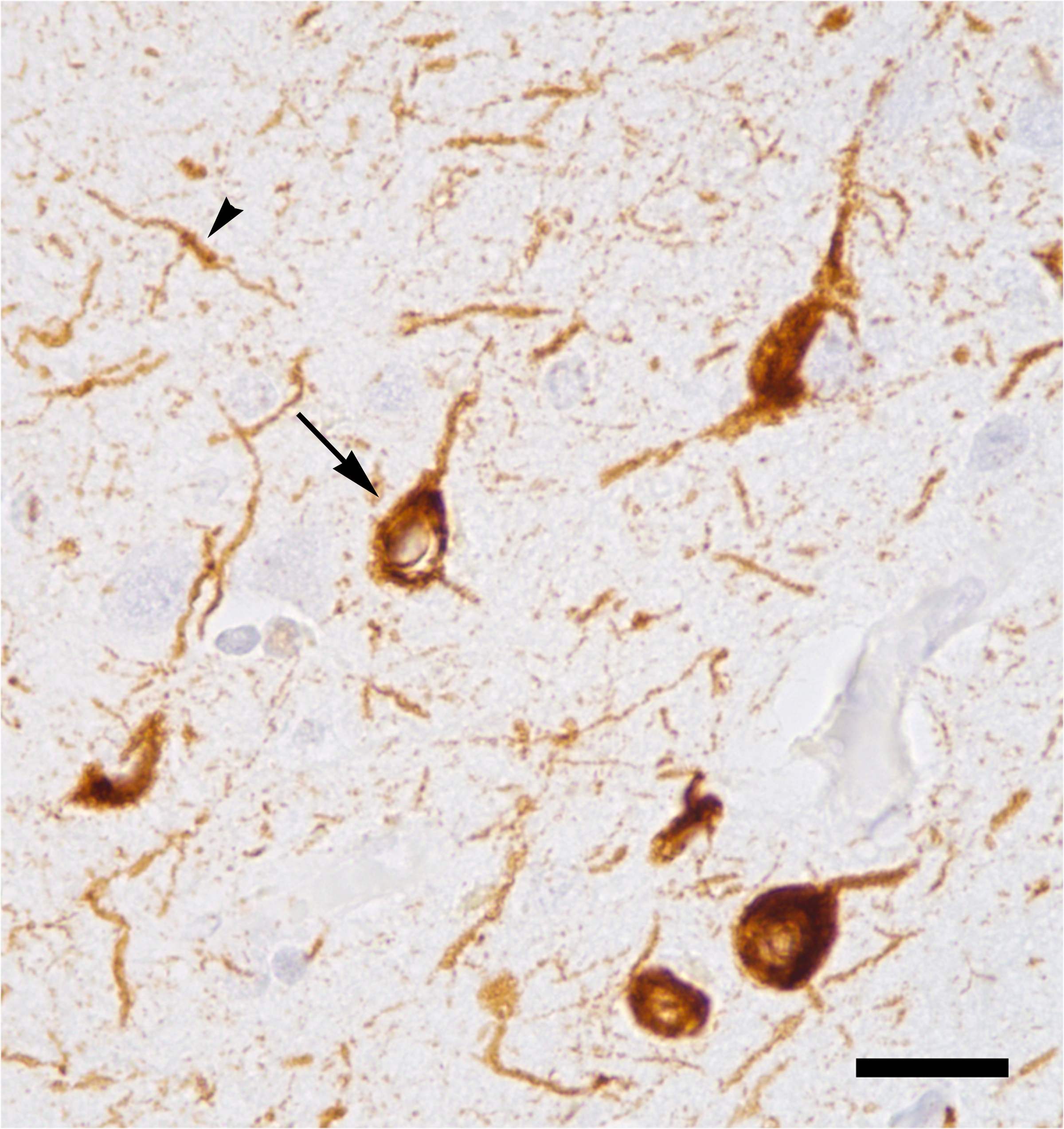
Micrograph of tauopathy (brown) in a neuronal cell body (arrow) and process (arrowhead) in the cerebral cortex of a patient with Alzheimer's disease. The scale bar=25 microns (0.025mm).

== See also ==
- Amyloidosis
- Neurofibrillary tangles
- Protein toxicity
- Prion
- Transmissible spongiform encephalopathy
