= C17H19ClN2S =

The molecular formula C_{17}H_{19}ClN_{2}S (molar mass: 318.86 g/mol) may refer to:

- Chlorpromazine, the oldest typical antipsychotic
- Thioflavin, two dyes used for histology staining
