= Cystidium =

Fungus cell type

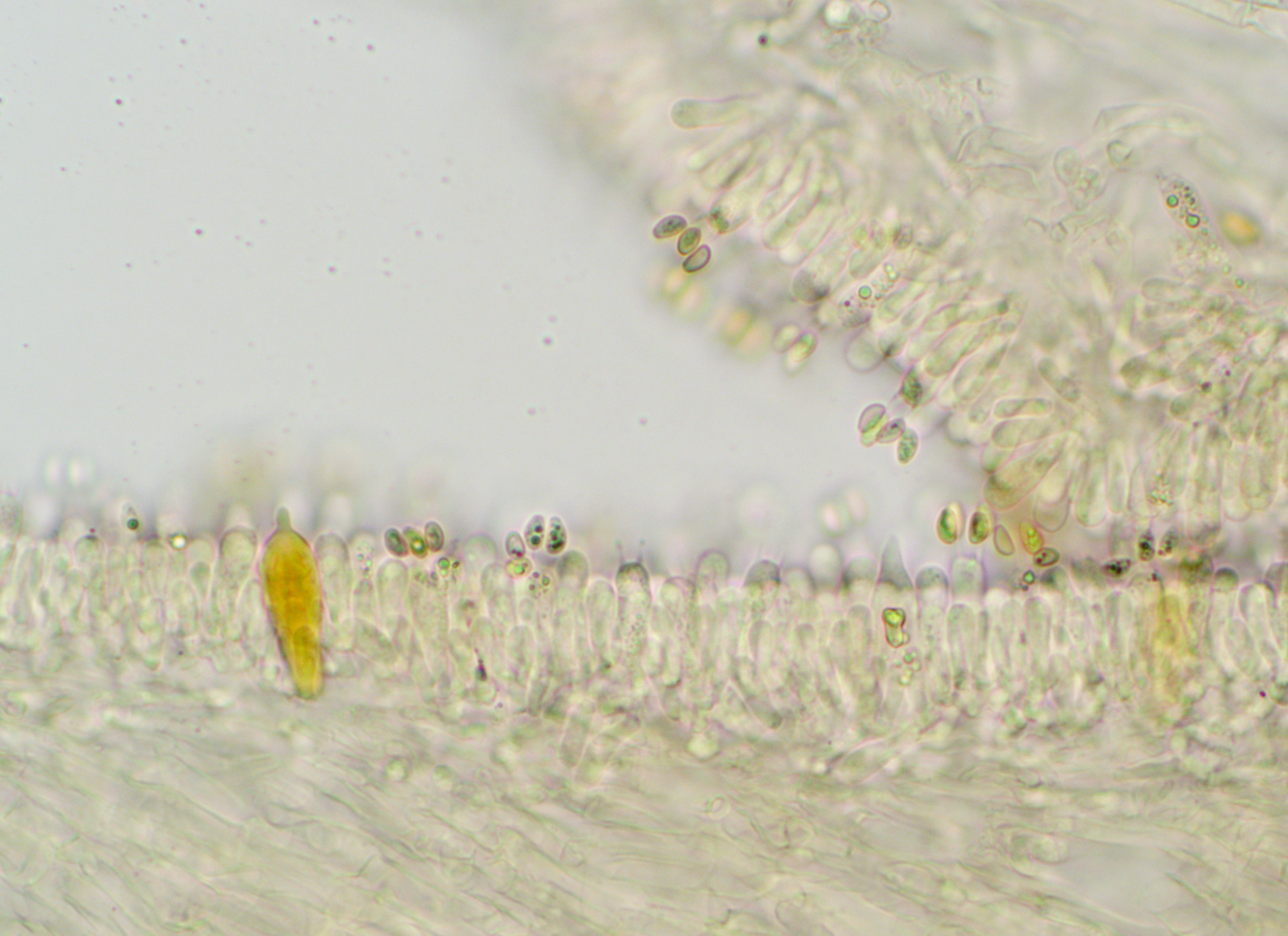
Two chrysocystidia on gill face of Hypholoma lateritium, mounted in KOH.

A cystidium (pl.: cystidia) is a relatively large cell found on the sporocarp of a basidiomycete (for example, on the surface of a mushroom gill), often between clusters of basidia. Since cystidia have highly varied and distinct shapes that are often unique to a particular species or genus, they are a useful micromorphological characteristic in the identification of basidiomycetes. In general, the adaptive significance of cystidia is not well understood.

== Classification ==
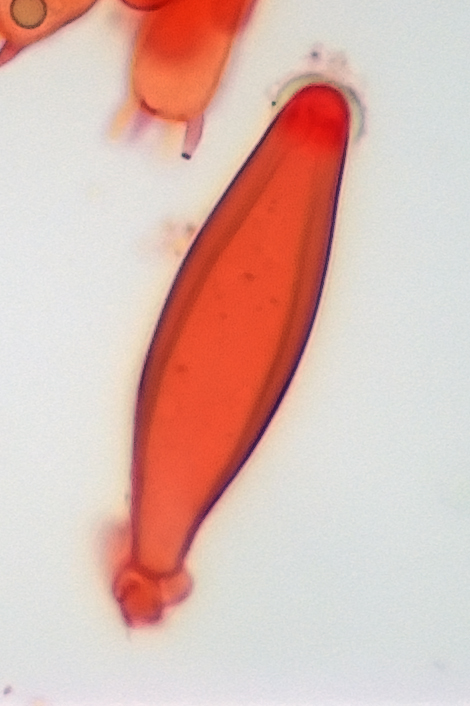
Metuloid-type cystidium of Inocybe, stained with Congo red

=== By position ===
Cystidia may occur on the edge of a lamella (or analogous hymenophoral structure) (cheilocystidia), on the face of a lamella (pleurocystidia), on the surface of the cap (dermatocystidia or pileocystidia), on the margin of the cap (circumcystidia) or on the stipe (caulocystidia). Especially the pleurocystidia and cheilocystidia are important for identification within many genera. Sometimes the cheilocystidia give the gill edge a distinct colour which is visible to the naked eye or with a hand lens.

=== By morphology ===
Chrysocystidia are cystidia whose contents contain a distinct refractive yellow body, that becomes more deeply yellow when exposed to ammonia or other alkaline compounds. Chrysocystidia are characteristic of many (though not all) members of the agaric family Strophariaceae.

Gloeocystidia have an oily or granular appearance under the microscope. Like gloeohyphae, they may be yellowish or clear (hyaline) and can sometimes selectively be coloured by sulphovanillin or other reagents. Metuloids are thick-walled cystidia with an apex having any of several distinct shapes.
