= LECT2 amyloidosis =

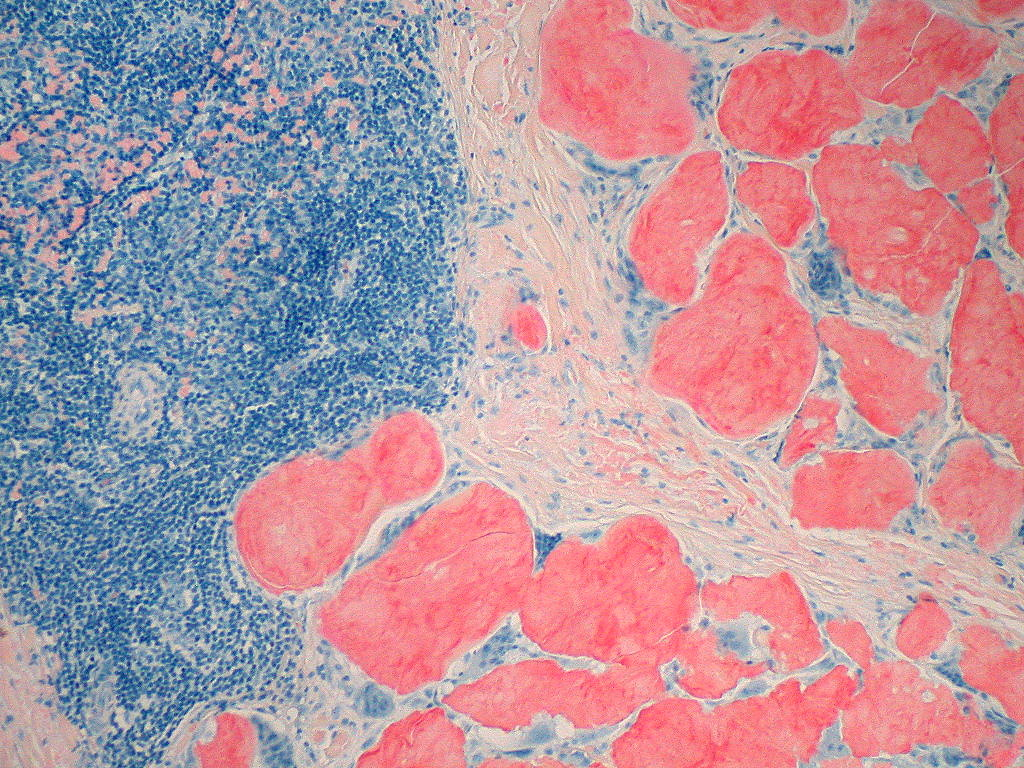
- Example of amyloid deposits under Congo Red staining

LECT2 Amyloidosis (ALECT2) is a form of amyloidosis caused by the LECT2 protein. It was found to be the third most common (~3% of total) cause of amyloidosis in a set of more than 4,000 individuals studied at the Mayo Clinic; the first and second most common forms the disorder were AL amyloidosis and AA amyloidosis, respectively. Amyloidosis is a disorder in which the abnormal deposition of a protein in organs and/or tissues gradually leads to organ failure and/or tissue injury.

Although more than 30 different proteins can cause amyloidosis, the disorder caused by LECT2 is distinctive in three ways. First, it has an unusually high incidence in certain ethnic populations. Second, it is a systemic form of amyloidosis (i.e. amyloid deposited in multiple organs), as opposed to a localized form (amyloid deposits limited to a single organ) but nonetheless injures the kidney without or rarely injuring the other organs in which it is deposited. Third, LECT2 amyloidosis is diagnosed almost exclusively in elderly individuals.

Given its relatively recent discovery, exceptionally strong ethnic bias, limitation to causing kidney disease, and restriction to elderly individuals, LECT2 amyloidosis appears at present to be an under-recognized cause of chronic kidney disease particularly in the ethnic groups that exhibit a high incidence of the disorder.

== Presentation ==
Most individuals diagnosed with LECT2 amyloidosis in the United States (88%) are of Mexican descent and reside in Southwest region of the United States (New Mexico, Arizona, far Western Texas). Other groups with higher incidence rates of the disorder include First Nation Peoples in Canada, Punjabis, South Asians, Sudanese, Native Americans, and Egyptians. In Egyptians, for example, LECT2 is second most common cause of renal amyloidosis, accounting for nearly 31% of all cases.

LECT2 amyloidosis (ALECT2) is generally diagnosed in individuals between the ages 40 and 90, with a mean age of 67 years old. The disorder commonly presents with renal disease that in general is advanced or at an end stage. Associated signs and symptoms of their renal disease may include fatigue, dehydration, blood in urine, and/or other evidence for the presence of the nephrotic syndrome or renal failure. Further studies may find that these individuals have histological or other evidence of LECT2 amyloid deposition in the liver, lung, spleen, kidney, and/or adrenal glands but nonetheless they rarely show any symptoms or signs attributable to dysfunction in these organs. Unlike many other forms of systemic amyloidosis, LECT2 deposition has not been reported to be deposited in the myocardium or brain of affected individuals. Thus, LECT2 amyloidosis, while classified as a form of systemic amyloidosis, almost exclusively manifests clinically as renal amyloidosis. No familial link has been found in the disorder although there have been several cases described among siblings.

== Cause ==
=== Gene ===
The human LECT2 gene, LECT2, is located on the long, i.e., "q", arm of chromosome 5 at position q31.1 (notated as 5q31.1). This location is close to several immune modulating genes including interleukins 3, 5, and 9 and granulocyte-macrophage colony stimulating factor. LECT2 is conserved in zebrafish, chicken, rat, mouse, cow. dog, Rhesus monkey, and chimpanzee. Human LECT2 is composed of 4 exons, 3 introns, and ~8,000 base pairs. The gene has numerous single nucleotide variants as well as other variations, two of which (see Pathophysiology section) have been associated with human disease. Human LECT2 has several different transcriptional initiation sights and codes for a mRNA composed of 1,000 to 1,300 ribonucleotides. mRNA for LECT2 is highly expressed in liver tissue and expressed at far lower levels in a wide range of other tssues.

=== Protein ===
The LECT2 protein consists of 133`amino acids Its structure is similar to that of the M23 family of metalloendopeptidases. Unlike this family of peptidases, however, LECT2 has not been found to possess enzymatic activity and does not appear to share any functions with M23 metalloendopeptidases. It is widely expressed in vascular tissues, smooth muscle cells, adipocytes, cerebral neurons, apical squamous epithelia, parathyroid tissues, the epithelial cells of sweat and sebaceous glands, Hassall bodies, and monocytes. The liver hepatocyte is considered to be the source of the LECT2 circulating in blood. However, its expression in these cells is extremely low or undetectable even though these cells express very high levels of LECT2 mRNA. This implies that hepatocytes secrete LECT2 almost immediately after they make it. Using very sensitive methods, LECT2 protein can also be detected at low levels in the endothelial cells of hepatic arteries and veins including central veins. Several cell types or tissues, e.g. osteoblasts, chondrocytes, cardiac tissue, gastrointestinal smooth muscle cells, and epithelial cells of some tissues normally do not express LECT2 but do so under a variety of disease conditions.

== Pathophysiology ==
LECT2 as a hepatokine, a substance made and released into the circulation by liver hepatocyte cells that acts as a hormone or signaling agent to regulate the function of other cells. While the pathogenesis of LECT2 amyloidosis is unclear, the intact LECT2 protein may have a tendency to fold abnormally thereby forming non-soluble fibrils that are deposited in tissues. It has been suggested that individuals with the disease have an increase in LECT2 production and/or a decrease in LECT2 catabolism (i.e. breakdown) which may increase its tendency to deposit in tissues. On the other hand, there are genetic variations which appear to cause the deposition of LECT2 in tissues. Studies to date have failed to obtain evidence for LECT2 gene mutations in the disorder but most cases examined in the United States are associated with a particular homozygous single nucleotide polymorphism (i.e. SNP) in the LECT2 gene. This SNP occurs in exon 3 at codon 58 of the gene, contains a guanine rather than adenine nucleotide at this site, and consequently codes for the amino acid valine rather than isoleucine. Although not yet proven to occur in vivo, the Val58Ile variant of LECT2 may have a propensity to fold abnormally, form insoluble fibrils, and therefore deposits in tissues. The Val58Ile LECT2 variant is common in Hispanics and appears to be the cause of their high incidence of LECT2 amyloidosis. However, not all homozygous Hispanic carriers of the variant ever exhibit LECT2 amyloidosis. This suggests that another factor(s) besides the variant Val58Ile protein's structure is involved in its organ/tissue deposition.

A second SNP which is also commonly found in Mexicans occurs at codon 172 of the LECT2 gene. This variant is homozygous for a G nucleotide at this codon position and is associated with an increased incidence of LECT2 amyloidosis. A reason for this association has not yet been proposed.

It has been found repeatedly that the mere presence of LECT2 amyloid tissue deposits does not necessarily indicate the presence of LECT2 amyloidosis disease. For example, autopsy studies find that up to 3.1% of Hispanics have these deposits in their kidneys but no history of signs or symptoms that could be attributed to LECT2 amyloidosis. This finding suggests that the LECT2 amyloidosis and its ethnic bias reflect multiple poorly understood factors.

== Diagnosis ==
LECT2 amyloidosis is diagnosed by a kidney biopsy which reveals two key findings: a) histological evidence of Congo red staining material deposited in the interstitial, mesangial, glomerular, and/or vascular areas of the kidney and b) the identification of these deposits as containing mainly LECT2 as identified by proteomics methodologies. Kidney biopsy shows the presence of LECT2-based amyloid predominantly in the renal cortex interstitium, glomeruli, and arterioles. LECT2 amyloidosis can be distinguished from AL amyloidosis, the most common form of amyloidosis (~85% of total cases), by testing their blood for the presence of high levels of a clonal immunoglobulin light chain. If the patient tests negative for this light chain, positive Congo Red staining of the kidney biopsy strongly suggests LECT2 amyloidosis.

== Treatment ==
There has been too little experience on the treatment of LECT2 amyloidosis to establish recommendations other than offering methods to support kidney function and dialysis. Nonetheless, it is important to accurately diagnose ALECT2-based amyloid disease in order to avoid treatment for other forms of amyloidosis.

== Prognosis ==
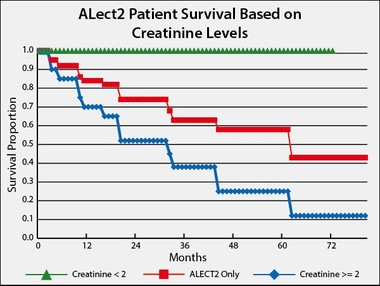
ALECT2 Patient Survival Based on Creatine Levels'

Based on studies conducted in the United States, the prognosis for individuals with ALECT2 is guarded, particularly because they are elderly and their kidney disease is usually well-advanced at the time of presentation. End-stage renal disease develops in 1 out of 3 patients and has a median renal survival of 62 months. A suggested prognostic tool is to track creatinine levels in ALECT2 patients. The attached Figure gives survival plotss for individuals with LECT2 renal amyloidosis and serum creatinine levels less than 2 mg/100 ml versus 2 mg/100 ml or greater than 2 mg/100 ml. The results show that afflicted individuals with lower creatinine levels have a ~four-fold higher survival rate.

== See also ==
- Amyloidosis
- LECT2
