= Primary cutaneous amyloidosis =

- Other names: Primary localized cutaneous amyloidosis
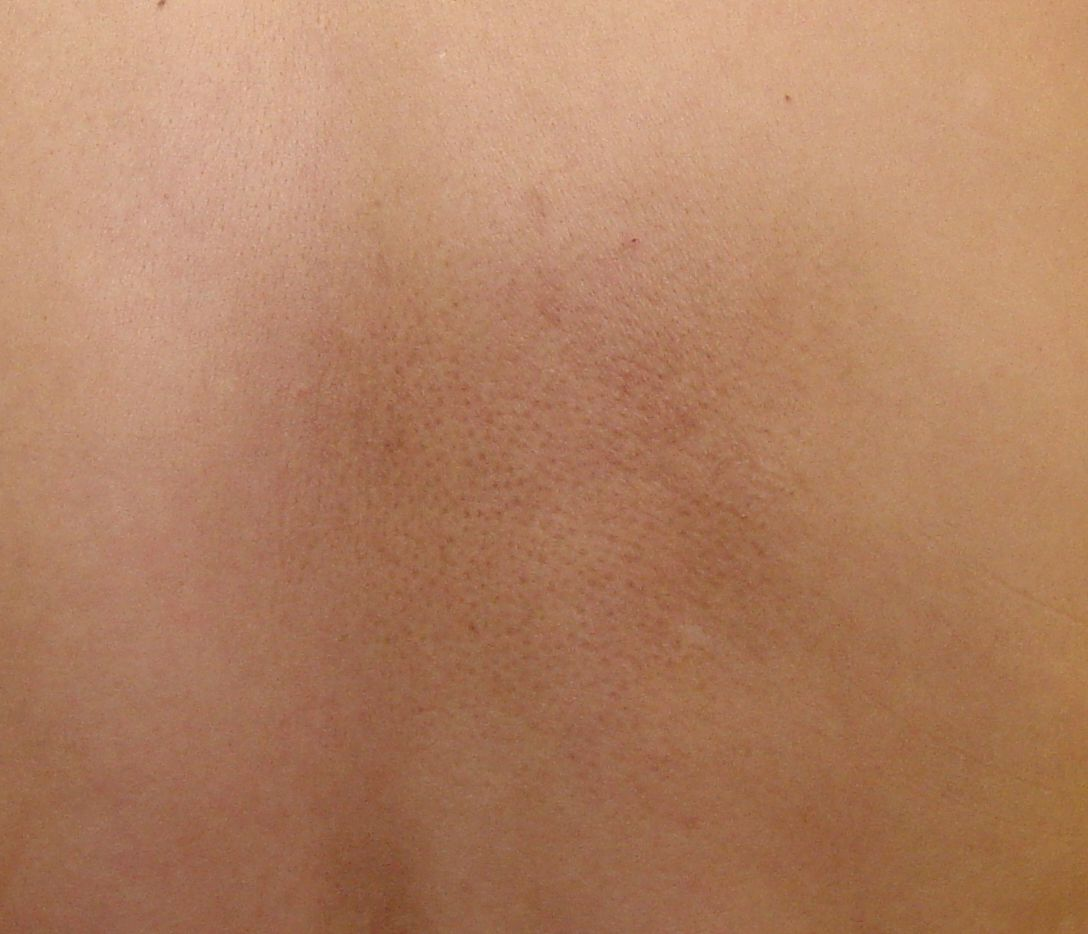
- Macular amyloidosis, located on the right lumbar region of the back
- Specialty: Dermatology

Primary cutaneous amyloidosis is a form of amyloidosis associated with oncostatin M receptor. This type of amyloidosis has been divided into the following types:

- Macular amyloidosis is a cutaneous condition characterized by itchy, brown, rippled macules usually located on the interscapular region of the back. Combined cases of lichen and macular amyloidosis are termed biphasic amyloidosis, and provide support to the theory that these two variants of amyloidosis exist on the same disease spectrum.
- Lichen amyloidosis is a cutaneous condition characterized by the appearance of occasionally itchy lichenoid papules, typically appearing bilaterally on the shins.
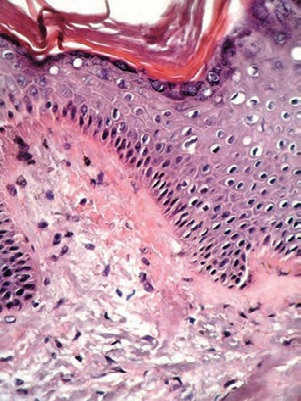
Histopathology of lichen amyloidosis, with subepithelial Congo red-positive deposits

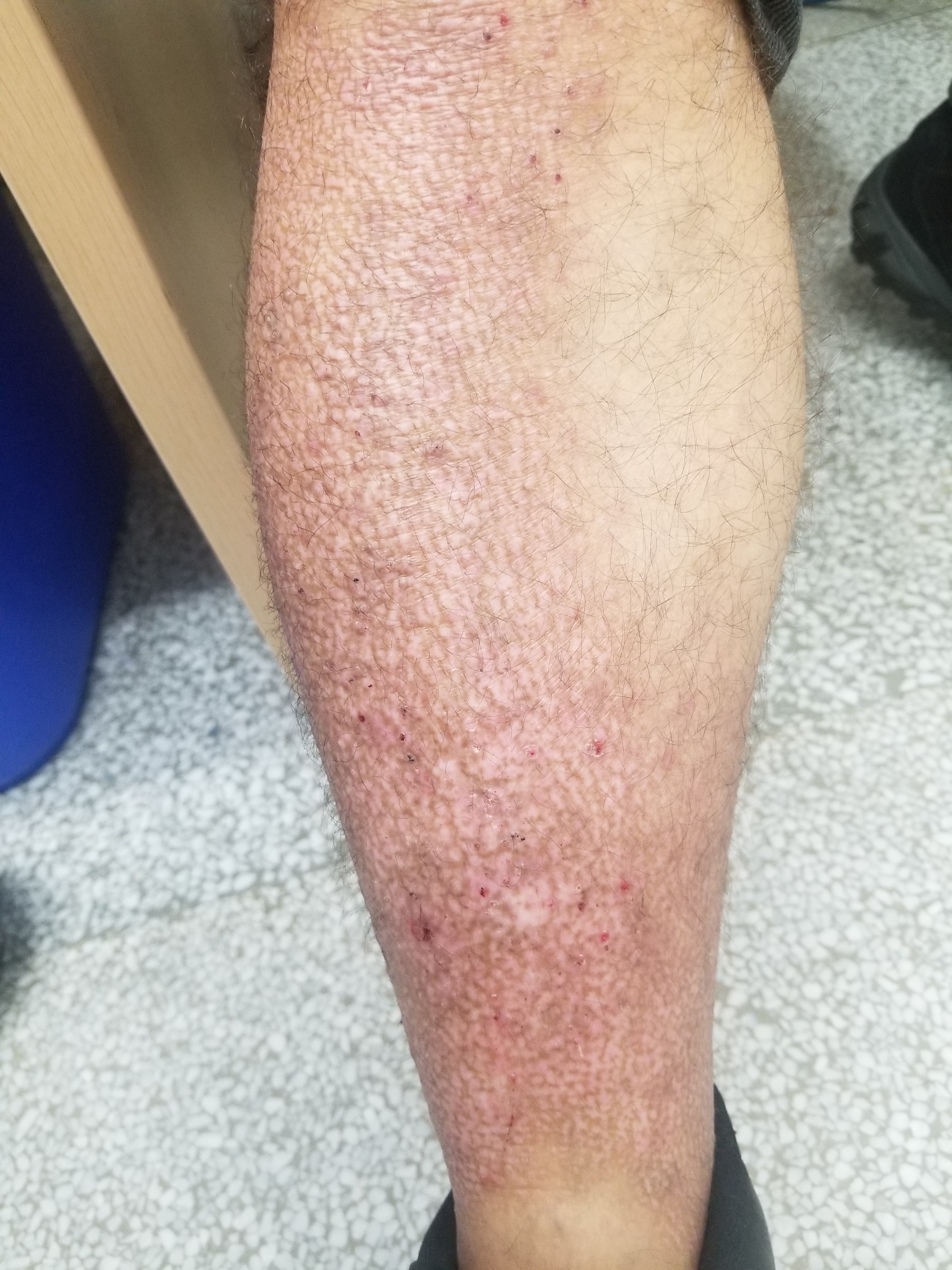
Lichen amyloidosis on a 56-year-old male's leg

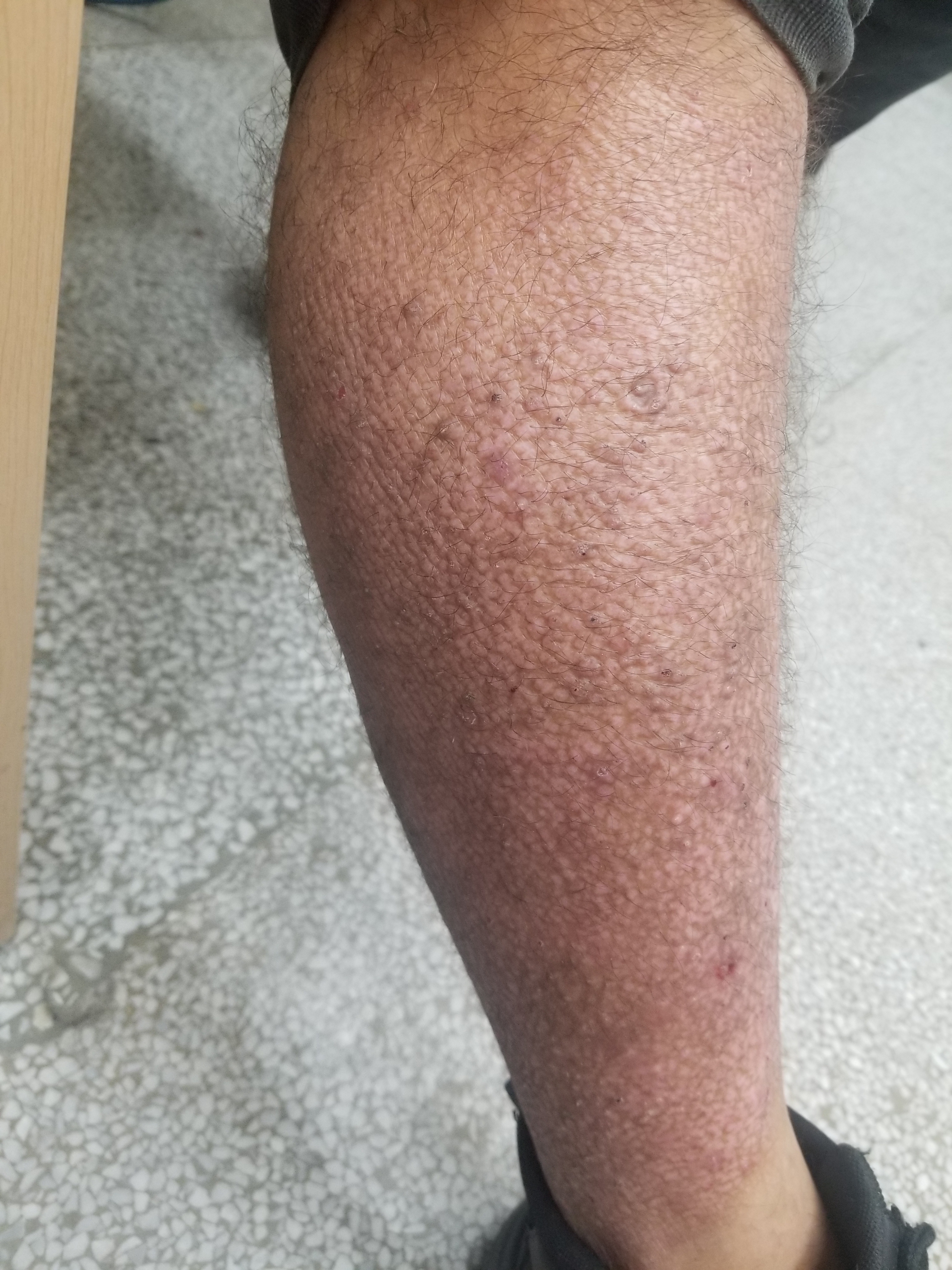
Lichen amyloidosis on a 56-year-old male's leg
- Nodular amyloidosis is a rare cutaneous condition characterized by nodules that involve the acral areas.

== See also ==
- Amyloidosis
- List of cutaneous conditions
