= LECT2 =

Protein-coding gene in the species Homo sapiens

Identifiers
- Aliases: LECT2, chm-II, chm2, leukocyte cell derived chemotaxin 2
- External IDs: OMIM: 602882; MGI: 1278342; GeneCards: LECT2
Available structures
| PDB | Ortholog search: PDBe RCSB |
| PDB | List of PDB id codes 5B0H |

Gene location (Human)
| Chr. | Chromosome 5 (human) |
| Band | 5q31.1 | Start | 135,922,279 bp |
| Band | 5q31.1 | End | 135,954,983 bp |

Gene location (Mouse)
| Chr. | Chromosome 13 (mouse) |
| Band | 13 B1|13 30.08 cM | Start | 56,690,277 bp |
| Band | 13 B1|13 30.08 cM | End | 56,696,315 bp |
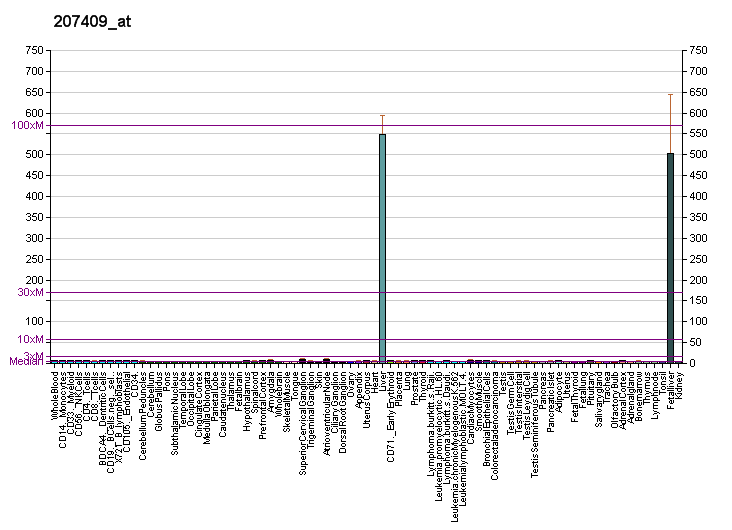
RNA expression pattern
| Bgee | Human / Mouse (ortholog); Top expressed in: buccal mucosa cell; liver; right lobe of liver; sperm; testicle; right testis; left testis; gonad; right adrenal cortex; gastric mucosa / Top expressed in: left lobe of liver; embryo; embryo; fetal liver hematopoietic progenitor cell; yolk sac; zygote; efferent ductule; small intestine; migratory enteric neural crest cell; gallbladder; More reference expression data |
| BioGPS | More reference expression data |
Gene ontology
| Molecular function | identical protein binding; protein binding; metal ion binding |
| Cellular component | cytoplasm; extracellular region; extracellular space |
| Biological process | chemotaxis; skeletal system development |
Sources:Amigo / QuickGO
Orthologs
| Databases | NCBI: entry; OMA: entry |
| Species | Human | Mouse |
| Entrez | 3950 | 16841 |
| Ensembl | ENSG00000145826 | ENSMUSG00000021539 |
| UniProt | O14960 | O88803 |
| RefSeq (mRNA) | NM_002302 | NM_010702 |
| RefSeq (protein) | NP_002293 | NP_034832 |
| Location (UCSC) | Chr 5: 135.92 – 135.95 Mb | Chr 13: 56.69 – 56.7 Mb |
| PubMed search |
- Wikidata
| View/Edit Human | View/Edit Mouse |

Leukocyte cell-derived chemotaxin-2 (LECT2) is a protein first described in 1996 as a chemotactic factor for neutrophils, i.e. it stimulated human neutrophils to move directionally in an in vitro assay system. The protein was detected in and purified from cultures of Phytohaemagglutinin-activated human T-cell leukemia SKW-3 cells. Subsequent studies have defined LECT2 as a hepatokine, i.e. a substance made and released into the circulation by liver hepatocyte cells that regulates the function of other cells: it is a hepatocyte-derived, hormone-like, signaling protein.

LECT2 has been detected in the blood and other tissues in a wide range of animal species from zebrafish to man. Furthermore, its levels in these tissues often change as a function of various diseases. These findings indicate that LECT is an evolutionary conserved protein, has one or more important functions, and may be involved in various diseases. However, LECT2's relationships to these diseases requires much further study before they can be regarded as established and clinically useful. One exception to this, however, is its proven role in amyloidosis. LECT2 is one of the more common causes of systemic (as opposed to localized) amyloidosis in North America as well as certain other ethnically-rich locations.

LECT2 and its gene, LECT2, are currently areas of active research that seek to implicate them as contributors to, markers for the presence of, and/or prognostic indicators for the severity of not only amyloidosis but also osteoarthritis, rheumatoid arthritis, and other types of inflammation-related disorders; the metabolic syndrome and diabetes; and various types of liver disease.

== Gene ==
The human LECT2 gene, LECT2, is located on the long, i.e., "q", arm of chromosome 5 at position q31.1 (notated as 5q31.1). This location is close to several immune modulating genes including interleukins 3, 5, and 9 and granulocyte-macrophage colony stimulating factor. LECT2 is conserved in zebrafish, chicken, rat, mouse, cow. dog, Rhesus monkey, and chimpanzee. Human LECT2 is composed of 4 exons, 3 introns, and ~8,000 base pairs. The gene has numerous single nucleotide variants as well as other variations, some of which have been associated with human disease. Human LECT2 has several different transcriptional initiation sights and codes for a mRNA composed of 1,000 to 1,300 ribonucleotides. mRNA for LECT2 is highly expressed in liver tissue and expressed at far lower levels in a wide range of other tssues.

== Protein ==
Human LECT2 is a secreted, 16 kilodalton protein. The secreted protein consists of 133`amino acids (mouse Lect2 consists of two varieties a typical 151 amino acid protein and an atypical 132 amino acid protein). Its structure is similar to that of the M23 family of metalloendopeptidases. Unlike this family of peptidases, however, LECT2 has not been found to possess enzymatic activity and does not appear to share any functions with M23 metalloendopeptidases.

LECT2 protein is widely expressed in vascular tissues, smooth muscle cells, adipocytes, cerebral neurons, apical squamous epithelia, parathyroid tissues, the epithelial cells of sweat and sebaceous glands, Hassall bodies, and monocytes. When these cells or tissues are subjected to inflammatory, fibrotic, and other insults, they commonly reduce their expression of LECT2. The liver hepatocyte is considered to be the source of the LECT2 circulating in blood. However, its expression in these cells is extremely low or undetectable even though these cells express very high levels of LECT2 mRNA. This implies that hepatocytes secrete LECT2 almost immediately after they make it. Using very sensitive methods, LECT2 protein can also be detected at low levels in the endothelial cells of hepatic arteries and veins including central veins. Several cell types or tissues, e.g. osteoblasts, chondrocytes, cardiac tissue, gastrointestinal smooth muscle cells, and epithelial cells of some tissues normally do not express LECT2 but do so under a variety of disease conditions.

== Disease associations ==
=== LECT2 amyloidosis ===
LECT2 amyloidosis (ALECT2) was the third most common (~3% of total) cause of amyloidosis in a series of >4,000 individuals studied at the Mayo Clinic in the United States. However, LECT2 amyloidosis has a strong ethnic bias, afflicting particularly Mexicans and to a lesser extent, non-Mexican Hispanics. Hispanics made an important contribution to the Mayo Clinic's rate of LECT2 amyloidosis. LECT2 amyloidosis also has an increased incidence in Punjabis, South Asians, First Nations people of British Columbia, Native Americans, and Egyptians. In Egyptians, LECT2 is second most common cause of renal amyloidosis, accounting for nearly 31% of all cases. LECT2 amyloidosis is likely to be a far less common cause of systemic amyloidosis in populations containing fewer numbers of individuals of the cited ethnic groups. On the other hand, LECT2 amyloidosis represents an important but at present very much under-recognized cause of chronic kidney disease in the cited ethnic groups and, possibly, other ethnic groups yet to be determined.

It has been found repeatedly that the mere presence of LECT2 amyloid tissue deposits does not necessarily indicate the presence of LECT2 amyloidosis disease. For example, autopsy studies find that up to 3.1% of Hispanics have these deposits in their kidneys but no history of signs or symptoms that could be attributed to LECT2 amyloidosis. This finding suggests that the LECT2 amyloidosis and its ethnic bias reflect multiple poorly understood factors.

==== Pathophysiology ====
While the pathogenesis of LECT2 amyloidosis is unclear, the intact LECT2 protein may have a tendency to fold abnormally thereby forming non-soluble fibrils that are deposited in tissues. It has been suggested that individuals with the disease have an increase in LECT2 production and/or a decrease in LECT2 catabolism (i.e. breakdown) which leads to its tissue deposition. However, there appears to be clear genetic variations that lead LECT2 tissue deposition. While studies to date have failed to obtain evidence for LECT2 gene mutations in the disorder, most cases examined in the United States are associated with a particular homozygous single nucleotide polymorphism (i.e. SNP) in the LECT2 gene. This SNP occurs in exon 3 at codon 58 of the gene, contains a guanine rather than adenine nucleotide at this site, and consequently codes for the amino acid valine rather than isoleucine. It is suggested although not yet proven that this Val58Ile variant of LECT2 has a propensity to fold abnormally and therefore deposits in tissues. The Val58Ile LECT2 variant is common in Hispanics and appears to be the cause of their high incidence of LECT2 amyloidosis. Nonetheless, not all homozygous carriers of the variant ever exhibit LECT2 amyloidosis.

A second SNP commonly found in Mexicans occurs at codon 172 of the LECT2 gene. This variant is homozygous for a G nucleotide at this codon position and has been associated with an increased incidence of LECT2 amyloidosis. A reason for this association has not yet been proposed.

==== Presentation ====
LECT2 amyloidosis presents with renal disease that in general is slowly progressive and at the time of presentation is of varying severity ranging from early findings of proteinuria or small elevations in blood urea nitrogen and/or creatinine to findings of end stage renal disease. At presentation, many individuals are elderly and suffer serious kidney dysfunction. They may have histological evidence of LECT2 amyloid deposition in the liver, lung, spleen, kidney, and adrenal glands of rarely show any symptoms or signs attributable to dysfunction in these organs. Unlike many other forms of systemic amyloidosis, LECT2 deposition has not been reported to be deposited in the myocardium or brain of afflicted individuals. Thus, LECT2 amyloidosis, while classified as a form of systemic amyloidosis, is almost exclusively manifested clinically as renal amyloidosis.

==== Diagnosis ====
LECT amyloidosis is diagnosed by two findings: a) histological evidence of Congo red staining material deposited in the interstitial, mesangial, glomerular, and/or vascular areas of the kidney and b) the identification of these deposits as containing mainly LECT2 as identified by proteomics methodologies. Kidney biopsy shows the presence of LECT2-based amyloid predominantly in the renal cortex interstitium, glomeruli, and arterioles.

==== Treatment ====
There Is too little experience on the treatment of LECT2 amyloidosis (ALECT2) to establish recommendations. There is no recommended specific treatment for LECT2 amyloidosis other than support of kidney function and dialysis. It is important to accurately diagnose ALECT2-based amyloid disease in order to avoid treatment for other forms of amyloidosis.

==== Prognosis ====
Based on studies conducted in the United States, the prognosis for individuals with LECT2 amyloidosis is guarded, particularly because they are elderly and their kidney disease is usually well-advanced at the time of presentation.

=== Rheumatoid arthritis ===
Studies conducted in a mouse model of rheumatoid arthritis indicate that the LECT2 protein suppresses the inflammatory component of this disorder. In human studies, the Val58Ile variant of LECT2 protein which has been associated with the development of LECT2 amyloidosis in Hispanics has also been associated with rheumatoid arthritis. That is, individuals homozygous for the gene making the Val58Ile variant of LECT2 have a small but significant increase in both the incidence and severity of this disease based on a study conducted in Japan. An increase in the severity and joint destruction of rheumatoid arthritis in humans was confirmed in a separate study conducted in Germany. These studies suggest that LECT2 normally functions to suppress the development and/or severity of human rheumatoid arthritis and that the Val58Ile variant of LECT2 is less effective in doing so.

=== Osteoarthritis ===
In a model of osteoarthritis, mice made deficient in LECT2 using a gene knockout method developed more severe osteoarthritis induced by anti-type II collagen antibodies and lipopolysaccharide. The effect was reversed by administering human LECT2 to the animals. A study conducted in Japan found that the expression levels of LECT2 were significantly higher in cartilage of osteoarthritic individuals than in control patients suggesting that LECT2 may be a useful biomarker for the disease.

=== Sepsis ===
In mouse models of bacterial sepsis caused by of E. coli, P. aeruginosa, and ligation followed by puncture of the cecum, the administration of human LECT2 improved survival. LECTT2 acted by directly stimulating the CD209 receptor on mouse macrophages thereby mobilizing their protective functions. Knockout of the Lect2 gene in mice increase the mortality caused by staphylococcal enterotoxin A; human LECT2 reduced this morality increase. Blood levels of LECT2 in patients suffering bacterial sepsis correlated inversely with the severity of systemic inflammation suggesting that LECT2 blood levels may be a reliable diagnostic indicator of human inflammatory diseases.

=== Diabetes ===
Deletion of the Lect2 gene in mice improves peripheral glucose entry into tissues. These studies suggest that mouse Lect2 suppresses insulin signaling in skeletal muscle but not adipose or liver tissues of Lect2-deficient mice and thereby may contribute to the development of insulin resistance. Indeed, serum levels of LECT2 are increased in animal models of insulin-resistant diabetes as well as in individual diabetics demonstrating insulin resistance. These data suggest that inhibiting LECT2 production or action may be clinically useful means for treating diabetes. In support of this notion, Gemigliptin, an anti-diabetic drug, has been shown reduce insulin resistance and concurrently inhibit Lect2 production in a mouse model of dietary-induces insulin resistance. Studies conducted on cultured myocytes, a form of muscle cell, indicates that LECT2 impairs insulin signaling by activating a c-Jun N-terminal kinases cell signaling pathway.

=== Metabolic syndrome ===
Mice made deficient in the Lect2 gene were compared to wild-type mice in a model of high fatty acid diet-induced obesity and the metabolic syndrome. Lect2-deficient mice appeared to be protected from developing certain characteristics of the metabolic syndrome: they exhibited less weight gain; lower blood glucose and insulin levels following feeding; and better results for glucose and insulin tolerance tests. In a study of 200 individuals in Japan, serum LECT2 levels correlated positively with (i.e. increased in proportion to increases in) several clinical features of the metabolic syndrome viz., body mass index, waist circumference, systolic blood pressure, selenoprotein P serum levels, and hemoglobin A1c blood levels. Levels of LECT2 are also elevated in individuals not only with diagnosed metabolic syndrome but also with a characteristic of and possible precursor to the metabolic syndrome, non-alcoholic fatty liver disease. LEPT2 has been suggested to be a potential therapeutic target for treating the metabolic syndrome.

=== Cancer ===
Circulating levels of LECT2 are elevated in >90% of individuals with hepatoblastoma and >20% of individuals with Hepatocellular carcinoma. In the latter form of liver cancer, LECT2 levels increase with increasingly poor prognostic stages of the disease and therefore may prove to be valuable prognostic markers.
