= MFGE8 =

Protein-coding gene in the species Homo sapiens

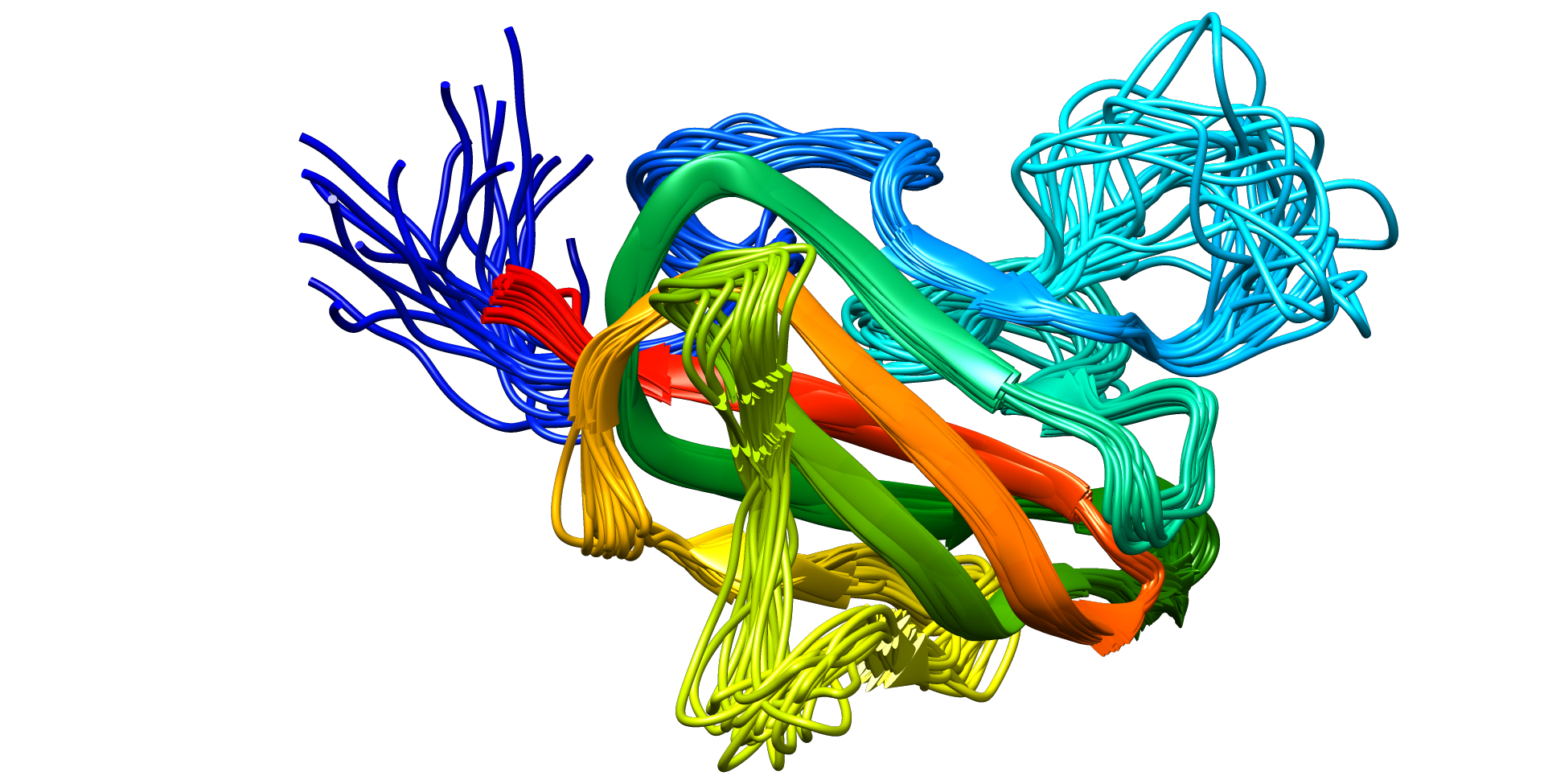
Available structures
PDB	Ortholog search: PDBe RCSB
PDB	List of PDB id codes 2L9L

Identifiers
- Aliases: MFGE8, milk fat globule-EGF factor 8 protein, BA46, EDIL1, HMFG, HsT19888, MFG-E8, MFGM, OAcGD3S, SED1, SPAG10, hP47, milk fat globule EGF and factor V/VIII domain containing
- External IDs: OMIM: 602281; MGI: 102768; HomoloGene: 4334; GeneCards: MFGE8; OMA:MFGE8 - orthologs

Gene location (Human)
Chr.	Chromosome 15 (human)
Band	15q26.1	Start	88,898,683 bp
Band	15q26.1	End	88,913,468 bp

Gene location (Mouse)
Chr.	Chromosome 7 (mouse)
Band	7 D2|7 44.9 cM	Start	78,783,516 bp
Band	7 D2|7 44.9 cM	End	78,798,808 bp
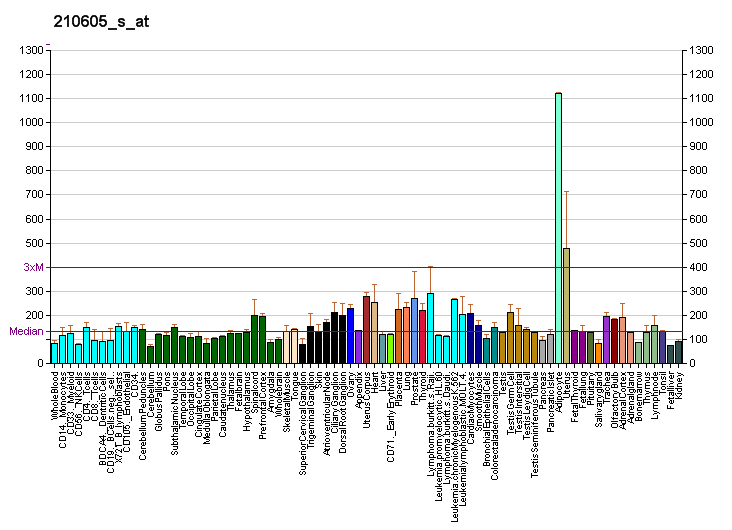
RNA expression pattern
Bgee	Human / Mouse (ortholog); Top expressed in: Descending thoracic aorta; ascending aorta; right coronary artery; left coronary artery; popliteal artery; tibial arteries; stromal cell of endometrium; left uterine tube; apex of heart; body of uterus / Top expressed in: lactiferous gland; mesenteric lymph nodes; tunica media of zone of aorta; entorhinal cortex; choroid plexus of fourth ventricle; perirhinal cortex; lacrimal gland; ascending aorta; molar; neural layer of retina; More reference expression data
BioGPS	More reference expression data
Gene ontology
Molecular function	phosphatidylserine binding; phosphatidylethanolamine binding; integrin binding; extracellular matrix structural constituent
Cellular component	external side of plasma membrane; extrinsic component of plasma membrane; extracellular region; extracellular exosome; extracellular matrix; extracellular vesicle; membrane; extracellular space; endoplasmic reticulum lumen; collagen-containing extracellular matrix
Biological process	phagocytosis, recognition; angiogenesis; positive regulation of phagocytosis; positive regulation of apoptotic cell clearance; phagocytosis, engulfment; cell adhesion; single fertilization; viral process; post-translational protein modification; apoptotic cell clearance
Sources:Amigo / QuickGO
Orthologs
Species	Human	Mouse
Entrez	4240	17304
Ensembl	ENSG00000140545	ENSMUSG00000030605
UniProt	Q08431	P21956
RefSeq (mRNA)	NM_001114614; NM_001310319; NM_001310320; NM_001310321; NM_005928	NM_001045489; NM_008594
RefSeq (protein)	NP_001108086; NP_001297248; NP_001297249; NP_001297250; NP_005919	NP_001038954; NP_032620
Location (UCSC)	Chr 15: 88.9 – 88.91 Mb	Chr 7: 78.78 – 78.8 Mb
PubMed search
- Wikidata
View/Edit Human	View/Edit Mouse

Milk fat globule-EGF factor 8 protein (Mfge8), also known as lactadherin, is a protein that in humans is encoded by the MFGE8 gene.

== Species distribution ==
Mfge8 is a secreted protein found in vertebrates, including mammals as well as birds.

== Function ==
MFGE8 may function as a cell adhesion protein to connect smooth muscle to elastic fibers in arteries. An amyloid fragment of MFGE8 known as medin accumulates in the aorta with aging. MFGE8 in the vasculature of adults can induce recovery from ischemia by facilitating angiogenesis. It has been suggested that antagonizing MFGE8-induced angiogenesis could be a way of fighting cancer.

MFGE8 contains a phosphatidylserine (PS) binding domain, as well as an arginine-glycine-aspartic acid motif, which enables the binding to integrins. MFGE8 binds PS, which is exposed on the surface of apoptotic cells. Opsonization of the apoptotic cells and binding to integrins on the surface of phagocytic cells, mediates the engulfment of the dead cell.
