= Thioflavin =

Thioflavin T

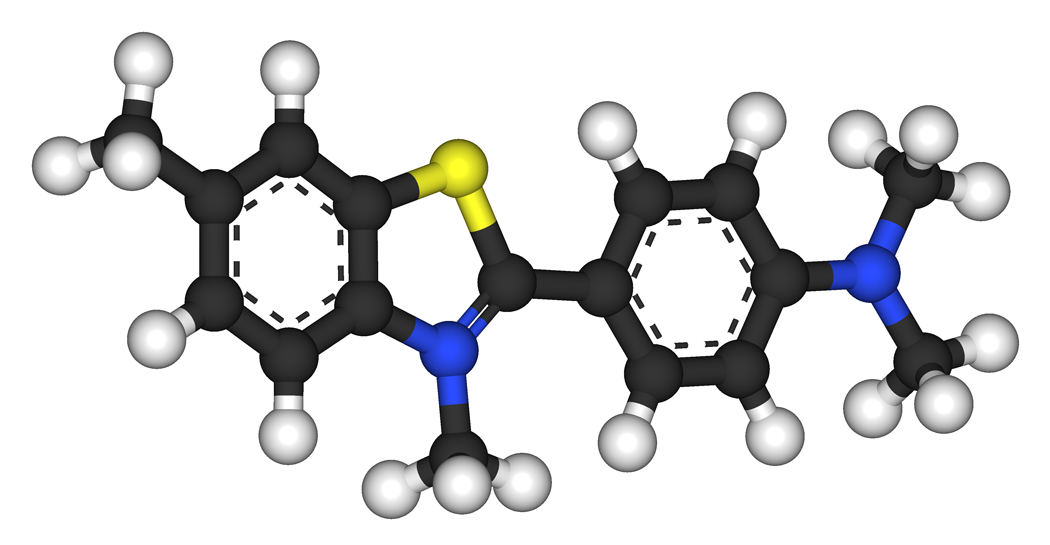

Names
- Preferred IUPAC name 2-[4-(Dimethylamino)phenyl]-3,6-dimethyl-1,3-benzothiazol-3-ium chloride

Identifiers
CAS Number	2390-54-7
3D model (JSmol)	Interactive image
ChEBI	CHEBI:88013
ChEMBL	ChEMBL224392; ChEMBL224392
ChemSpider	16062
ECHA InfoCard	100.017.482
PubChem CID	16953
UNII	CAX9SG0II0
CompTox Dashboard (EPA)	DTXSID10883841
- InChI: InChI=1S/C17H19N2S.ClH/c1-12-5-10-15-16(11-12)20-17(19(15)4)13-6-8-14(9-7-13)18(2)3;/h5-11H,1-4H3;1H/q+1;/p-1 Key: JADVWWSKYZXRGX-UHFFFAOYSA-M; InChI=1/C17H19N2S.ClH/c1-12-5-10-15-16(11-12)20-17(19(15)4)13-6-8-14(9-7-13)18(2)3;/h5-11H,1-4H3;1H/q+1;/p-1 Key: JADVWWSKYZXRGX-REWHXWOFAC
- SMILES: [Cl-].s2c1cc(ccc1[n+](c2c3ccc(N(C)C)cc3)C)C

Properties
Chemical formula	C_{17}H_{19}ClN_{2}S
Molar mass	318.86 g/mol
Density	1.301 g/cm^{3}
Melting point	137.9 °C (decomp.)
- Except where otherwise noted, data are given for materials in their standard state (at 25 °C [77 °F], 100 kPa). verify (what is ?) Infobox references

Thioflavins are fluorescent dyes that are available as at least two compounds, namely Thioflavin T and Thioflavin S. Both are used for histology staining and biophysical studies of protein aggregation. In particular, these dyes have been used since 1959 to investigate amyloid formation. They are also used in biophysical studies of the electrophysiology of bacteria. Thioflavins are corrosive, irritant, and acutely toxic, causing serious eye damage. Thioflavin T has been used in research into Alzheimer's disease and other neurodegenerative diseases.

== Thioflavin T ==
Thioflavin T (Basic Yellow 1, Methylene yellow, CI 49005, or ThT) is a benzothiazole salt obtained by the methylation of dehydrothiotoluidine with methanol in the presence of hydrochloric acid. The dye is widely used to visualize and quantify the presence of misfolded protein aggregates called amyloid, both in vitro and in vivo (e.g., plaques composed of amyloid beta found in the brains of Alzheimer's disease patients).

When it binds to beta sheet-rich structures, such as those in amyloid aggregates, the dye displays enhanced fluorescence and a characteristic red shift of its emission spectrum. Additional studies also consider fluorescence changes as result of the interaction with double stranded DNA. This change in fluorescent behavior can be caused by many factors that affect the excited state charge distribution of thioflavin T, including binding to a rigid, highly-ordered nanopocket, and specific chemical interactions between thioflavin T and the nanopocket.

Prior to binding to an amyloid fibril, thioflavin T emits weakly around 427 nm. Quenching effects of the nearby excitation peak at 450 nm is suspected to play a role in minimizing emissions.

When excited at 450 nm, thioflavin T produces a strong fluorescence signal at approximately 482 nm upon binding to amyloids. Thioflavin T molecule consists of a phenylamine and a benzothiazole ring connected through a carbon-carbon bond. These two rings can rotate freely when the molecule is in solution. The free rotation of these rings results in quenching of any excited state generated by photon excitation. However, when thioflavin T binds to amyloid fibrils, the two rotational planes of the two rings become immobilized and therefore, this molecule can maintain its excited state.

Thioflavin T fluorescence is often used as a diagnostic of amyloid structure, but it is not perfectly specific for amyloid. Depending on the particular protein and experimental conditions, thioflavin T may or may not undergo a spectroscopic change upon binding to precursor monomers, small oligomers, unaggregated material with a high beta sheet content, or even alpha helix-rich proteins. Conversely, some amyloid fibers do not affect thioflavin T fluorescence, raising the prospect of false negative results.

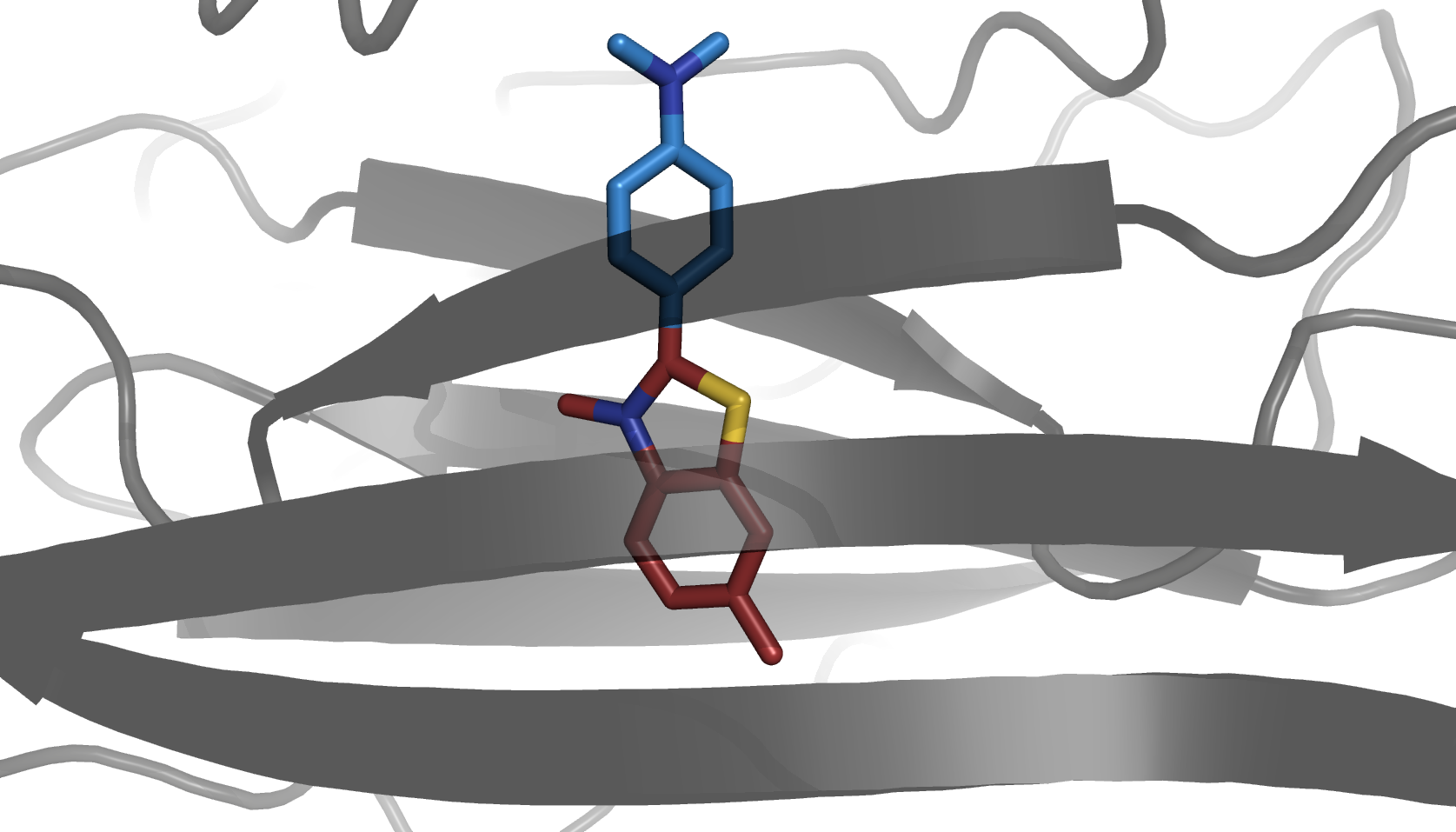
Structure of thioflavin T bound to an amyloid-like oligomer of β2 microglobulin (in gray), in a complex that displays enhanced and red shifted fluorescence. Many factors that shift the excited state charge from the dimethylaminobenzyl portion of thioflavin T (in blue) to the benzothiazole portion (in red), including binding to rigid, highly-ordered amyloid aggregates, can produce this 'positive' thioflavin T signal.

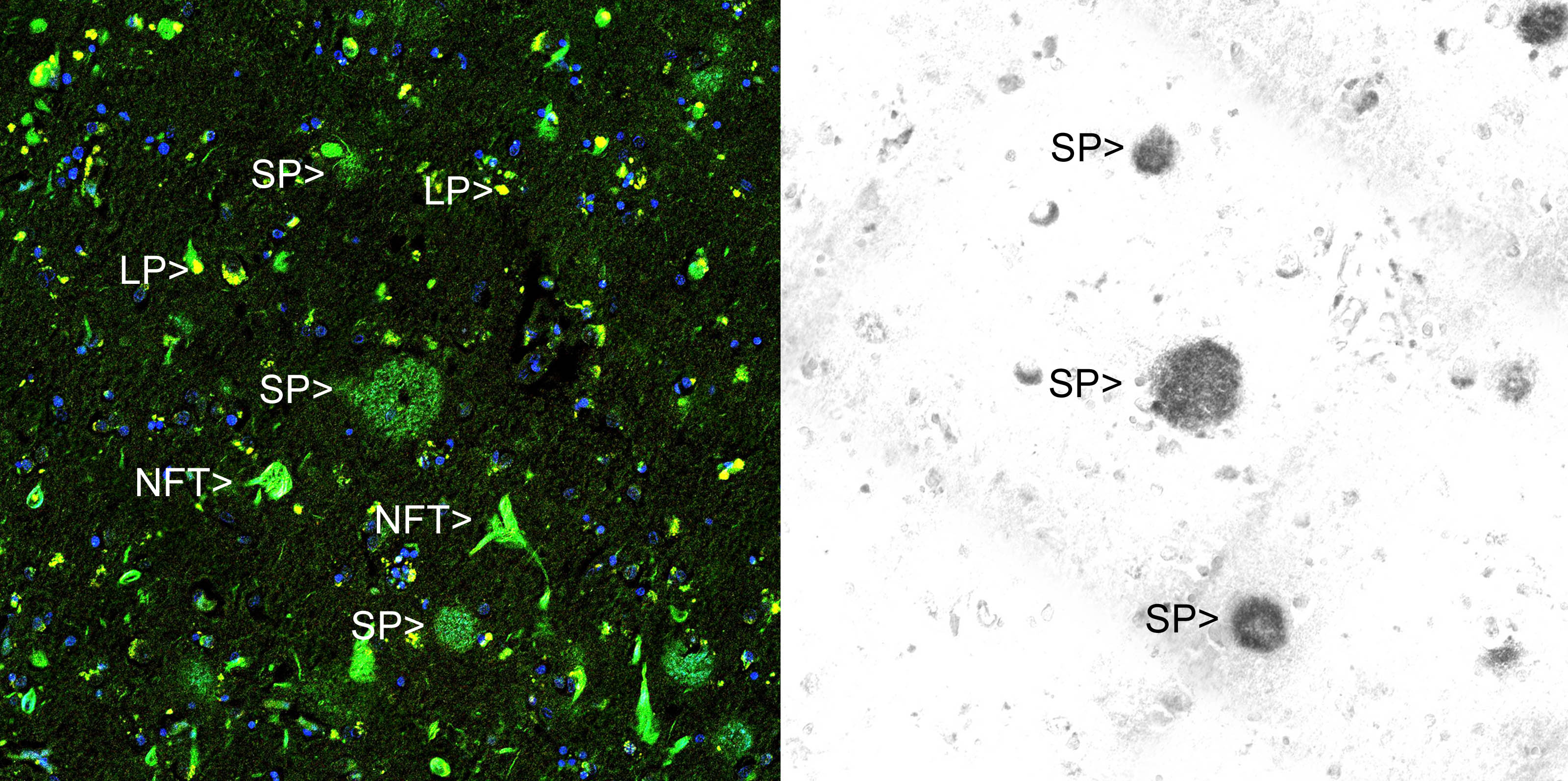
Thioflavin S stain (left in green) and amyloid-Beta antibody immunocytochemistry (right) on adjacent sections of the hippocampus of a patient suffering from Alzheimer's disease. Thioflavin S binds both senile plaques (SP) and neurofibrillary tangles (NFT), the two characteristic cortical lesions of Alzheimer's. Amyloid beta is a peptide derived from the amyloid precursor protein which is only found in senile plaques, and so only plaques are visible in the right hand image. The left image also has a red signal which exactly superimposes the green signal in lipofuscin granules (LP), which are autofluorescent inclusions derived from lysosomes which accumulate in the human brain during normal aging.

In adult C. elegans, exposure to thioflavin T results "in a profoundly extended lifespan and slowed aging" at some levels, but decreased lifespan at higher levels.

== Thioflavin S ==
Thioflavin S is a homogenous mixture of compounds that results from the methylation of dehydrothiotoluidine with sulfonic acid. It is also used to stain amyloid plaques. Like thioflavin T it binds to amyloid fibrils but not monomers and gives a distinct increase in fluorescence emission. However unlike thioflavin T, it does not produce a characteristic shift in the excitation or emission spectra. This latter characteristic of thioflavin S results in high background fluorescence, making it unable to be used in quantitative measurements of fibril solutions. Another dye that is used to identify amyloid structure is Congo red.

== See also ==
- Congo red
