= Familial amyloid neuropathy =

- Specialty: Endocrinology

The familial amyloid neuropathies (or familial amyloidotic neuropathies, neuropathic heredofamilial amyloidosis, familial amyloid polyneuropathy) are a rare group of autosomal dominant diseases wherein the autonomic nervous system and/or other nerves are compromised by protein aggregation and/or amyloid fibril formation.

== Classification ==
The aggregation of one precursor protein leads to peripheral neuropathy and/or autonomic nervous system dysfunction. These proteins include: transthyretin (ATTR, the most commonly implicated protein), apolipoprotein A1, and gelsolin.

Due to the rareness of the other types of familial neuropathies, transthyretin amyloidogenesis-associated polyneuropathy should probably be considered first.

"FAP-I" and "FAP-II" are associated with transthyretin. (Senile systemic amyloidosis [abbreviated "SSA"] is also associated with transthyretin aggregation.)

"FAP-III" is also known as "Iowa-type", and involves apolipoprotein A1.

"FAP-IV" is also known as "Finnish-type", and involves gelsolin.

Fibrinogen, apolipoprotein A1, and lysozyme are associated with a closely related condition, familial visceral amyloidosis.

Diagnosis is confirmed by blood tests, organ biopsies, and tissue biopsies. Genetic testing can also be used to confirm a mutation in the TTR gene. Although some people with a hATTR gene mutation may not experience symptoms.

== Treatment ==
Liver transplantation has proven to be effective for ATTR familial amyloidosis due to Val30Met mutation.

In 2011 the European Medicines Agency approved tafamidis for this condition. The FDA rejected the application for marketing approval in the US in 2012 on the basis that the clinical trial data did not show efficacy based on a functional endpoint, and the FDA requested further clinical trials.
