= Acoramidis =

Chemical compound

Clinical data
- Pronunciation: ə-corAM-i-dis
- Trade names: Attruby, others
- Other names: AG10
- AHFS/Drugs.com: Monograph
- MedlinePlus: a625013
- License data: US DailyMed: Acoramidis
- Routes of administration: By mouth
- Drug class: Amyloidogenesis suppressant
- ATC code: C01EB25 (WHO)

Legal status
- Legal status: US: ℞-only; EU: Rx-only

Identifiers
- IUPAC name: 3-[3-(3,5-Dimethyl-1H-pyrazol-4-yl)propoxy]-4-fluorobenzoic acid
- CAS Number: 1446711-81-4; 2242751-53-5
- PubChem CID: 71464713; 71464713
- IUPHAR/BPS: 135307127
- DrugBank: DB17999
- ChemSpider: 35033544
- UNII: T12B44A1OE; VY9C88C2NV
- KEGG: D11972; D11973
- ChEMBL: ChEMBL3940890; ChEMBL4650226
- PDB ligand: 16V (PDBe, RCSB PDB)

Chemical and physical data
- Formula: C_{15}H_{17}FN_{2}O_{3}
- Molar mass: 292.310 g·mol^{−1}
- 3D model (JSmol): Interactive image
- SMILES: CC1=C(C(=NN1)C)CCCOC2=C(C=CC(=C2)C(=O)O)F
- InChI: InChI=1S/C15H17FN2O3/c1-9-12(10(2)18-17-9)4-3-7-21-14-8-11(15(19)20)5-6-13(14)16/h5-6,8H,3-4,7H2,1-2H3,(H,17,18)(H,19,20); Key:WBFUHHBPNXWNCC-UHFFFAOYSA-N; InChI=1S/C15H17FN2O3.ClH/c1-9-12(10(2)18-17-9)4-3-7-21-14-8-11(15(19)20)5-6-13(14)16;/h5-6,8H,3-4,7H2,1-2H3,(H,17,18)(H,19,20);1H; Key:MGFZEARHINUOMX-UHFFFAOYSA-N

Acoramidis, sold under the brand name Attruby, is a medication used for the treatment of cardiomyopathy. It is a near-complete (>90%) transthyretin stabilizer, developed to mimic the protective properties of the naturally occurring T119M mutation, to treat transthyretin amyloid cardiomyopathy. It is taken by mouth.

The most common adverse reactions include diarrhea and upper abdominal pain.

Acoramidis was approved for medical use in the United States in November 2024, and in the European Union in February 2025.

== Medical uses ==
Acoramidis is indicated for the treatment of the cardiomyopathy of wild-type or variant transthyretin-mediated amyloidosis (ATTR-CM) in adults to reduce cardiovascular death and cardiovascular-related hospitalization.

== Side effects ==
The most common side effects are diarrhea and abdominal pain.

== History ==
The efficacy and safety of acoramidis were evaluated in a multicenter, international, randomized, double-blind, placebo-controlled study in 611 adult participants with wild-type or hereditary (variant) ATTR-CM (NCT03860935).

=== Clinical trials ===
Phase I data indicated acoramidis achieved near-complete (>90%) TTR stabilization across the entire dosing interval at steady state.

Phase II and the Open-Label Extension (OLE) data indicated after a median of 38 months, long-term treatment with acoramidis was generally well tolerated and resulted in a median decline in NT-proBNP levels, normalization of serum TTR, and sustained stabilization of TTR in individuals with ATTR-CM.

Phase III data from ATTRibute-CM indicated acoramidis resulted in a significantly better four-step primary hierarchical outcome containing components of mortality, morbidity, and function than placebo at 30 months in participants with ATTR-CM. Adverse events were similar in the two groups. This primary outcome measure was analyzed using Generalized Pairwise Comparisons and reported using a win statistics measure of treatment effect.

Other analyses from ATTRibute-CM indicated a 50% reduction in cumulative cardiovascular hospitalizations (CVH), a 42% reduction in all-cause mortality (ACM) and recurrent CVH, and a 3-month time-to-separation of the Kaplan Meier curves for ACM or CVH. No other treatment has demonstrated this degree of treatment effect this quickly in participants with ATTR-CM.

In vitro data indicated acoramidis exhibits near-complete (>90%) TTR stabilization at therapeutic trough concentrations.

== Society and culture ==
=== Legal status ===
Acoramidis was approved for medical use in the United States in November 2024. The approval was granted to BridgeBio Pharma.

In December 2024, the Committee for Medicinal Products for Human Use of the European Medicines Agency (EMA) adopted a positive opinion, recommending the granting of a marketing authorization for the medicinal product Beyonttra, intended for the treatment of transthyretin amyloidosis in adults with cardiomyopathy. The applicant for this medicinal product is BridgeBio Europe B.V. Acoramidis was designated an orphan medicine by the EMA. Acoramidis was authorized for medical use in the European Union in February 2025.

=== Names ===
During development, acoramidis was known as AG10 (the Alhamadsheh-Graef molecule 10).

Acoramidis is the international nonproprietary name.

Acoramidis is sold under the brand names Attruby and Beyonttra.
