= Vutrisiran =

Medication

Clinical data
- Trade names: Amvuttra
- Other names: ALN-65492, ALN-TTRSC02
- AHFS/Drugs.com: Monograph
- MedlinePlus: a622061
- License data: US DailyMed: Vutrisiran
- Pregnancy category: AU: D
- Routes of administration: Subcutaneous
- Drug class: Small interfering RNA
- ATC code: N07XX18 (WHO)

Legal status
- Legal status: AU: S4 (Prescription only); CA: ℞-only; US: ℞-only; EU: Rx-only

Identifiers
- CAS Number: 1867157-35-4
- DrugBank: DB16699; as salt: DBSALT003187
- UNII: GB4I2JI8UI; as salt: 28O0WP6Z1P
- KEGG: D11917; as salt: D11916

Vutrisiran, sold under the brand name Amvuttra, is a medication used for the treatment of the polyneuropathy of hereditary transthyretin-mediated (hATTR) amyloidosis in adults. It is a double stranded small interfering RNA (siRNA; also called RNA interference or RNAi therapeutic) that interferes with the expression of the transthyretin (TTR) gene. Transthyretin is a serum protein made in the liver whose major function is transport of vitamin A and thyroxine. Rare mutations in the transthyretin gene result in accumulation of large amyloid deposits of misfolded transthyretin molecules most prominently in peripheral nerves and the heart. Patients with hATTR typically present with polyneuropathy or autonomic dysfunction followed by cardiomyopathy which, if untreated, is fatal within 5 to 10 years.

Vutrisiran was approved for medical use in the United States in June 2022, in the European Union in September 2022, and in Australia in June 2024.

== Medical uses ==
Vutrisiran is indicated for the treatment of the polyneuropathy of hereditary transthyretin-mediated amyloidosis in adults. In 2025, the medication was approved by the United States Food and Drug Administration to treat familial amyloid cardiomyopathy in the U.S.

== Adverse effects ==
Vutrisiran is generally well tolerated but side effects can include injection site reactions, fatigue, arthralgia, dyspnea, diarrhea and musculoskeletal pains. Vutrisiran treatment leads to decreased Vitamin A levels and supplementation at the recommended daily allowance of vitamin A is advised. Patients should be referred to an ophthalmologist if ocular symptoms suggestive of vitamin A deficiency (e.g. night blindness) develop.

== Pharmacokinetics ==
Plasma concentration profiles of vutrisiran showed rapid absorption and elimination from systemic circulation. There was a dose-proportional increase in peak plasma concentrations Cmax and a slightly greater than dose-proportional increase in AUC∞ inf and AUC last after a single subcutaneous dose across the dose range studied in the phase I trial in healthy volunteers. However, accumulation was not evident after repeated administration of vutrisiran 25 mg every 3 months in patients with hATTR amyloidosis. Plasma concentrations of vutrisiran were detectable at 10 minutes after SC administration and peak plasma concentrations were seen at a median 4 h after SC administration of a 25 mg single dose in healthy volunteers. Plasma half-life was (4.2–7.5 hours). The apparent volume of distribution of vutrisiran is estimated to be 10.1 L. Vutrisiran is 80% plasma protein bound; however, plasma protein binding is concentration dependent and decreases with increasing concentrations. Vutrisiran distributes mainly to the liver after subcutaneous administration. The plasma clearance of siRNA is primarily influenced by ASGPR-facilitated uptake into the liver where the siRNAs are gradually metabolized by endonucleases and exonucleases to short nucleotide fragments of varying sizes. After a 25 mg single dose SC vutrisiran in healthy volunteers, the median elimination half-life was 5.2 h and the median apparent clearance was 21.4 L/h. The primary pathway for excretion of vutrisiran is via the kidneys, although the fraction of renal clearance to total clearance was 15.5–27.5% after a single 5–300 mg subcutaneous dose in healthy volunteers, indicating that renal excretion is a minor route of elimination. Across the dose levels tested, mean renal CLR of vutrisiran ranged from 4.45 to 5.74 L/hour (mean, 5 L/hour) after a single subcutaneous dose in healthy volunteers and the percentage of vutrisiran dose excreted unchanged in urine through 24 hours ranged between 15 and 25% and increased slightly with increasing dose, with a majority excreted within the first 12 hours after administration. Age, sex, bodyweight, race, and mild or moderate kidney impairment or mild hepatic impairment do not have clinically significant effects on vutrisiran pharmacokinetics. In vitro, vutrisiran was neither a substrate nor inhibitor of cytochrome P450 enzymes and is not expected to cause drug- drug interaction by inducing CYP enzymes. Vutrisiran is not expected to modulate drug transporter activities.

== Mechanism of action ==
Vutrisiran is a gene silencing double-stranded siRNA-GalNAc conjugate that causes degradation of mutant and wild-type TTR mRNA through RNA interference by binding and silencing messenger RNA (mRNA) encoding for disease causing protein (Transthyretin), which results in a reduction of serum TTR protein and TTR protein deposits in tissues. Vutrisiran utilises a GalNAc conjugate delivery platform which is an enhanced stabilisation chemistry. This allows subcutaneous administration of smaller doses with longer dosing intervals.

== History ==
The U.S. Food and Drug Administration (FDA) granted the application for vutrisiran orphan drug designation.

=== Efficacy and trials ===
Preclinical: In preclinical studies involving nonhuman primates, single SC doses of vutrisiran 0.3 and 1 mg/kg achieved mean maximum TTR reductions of 55% and 96%, respectively, with serum TTR reductions persisting beyond 4 months for the 1 mg/kg dose. In the same study, monthly doses of 1 and 3 mg/kg maintained a reduction of TTR levels at 96%, relative to baseline. These potent and durable pharmacodynamic properties of vutrisiran, together with an acceptable safety profile, prompted further evaluation in a phase I clinical study.

Clinical trials:

A phase I clinical trial (NCT02797847) was completed in January 2018, in which vutrisiran was evaluated to determine the safety, tolerability, pharmacokinetics, and pharmacodynamics in 80 healthy volunteers. It was a randomized, single blind, placebo- controlled study. Participants were randomized 6:2 to receive a single subcutaneous dose of vutrisiran (5 – 300 mg) or placebo (normal saline). Vutrisiran was found to be well tolerated, established a good safety profile and elicited rapid robust and durable TTR reduction. Vutrisiran achieved a dose-dependent TTR knockdown; a single 25 mg subcutaneous dose resulted in a maximum TTR reduction of 80%, which was sustained for 90 days. Based on these results, the company launched two phase III trials: HELIOS-A and HELIOS-B.

HELIOS-A (NCT03759379) was a phase III, global, open-label study comparing the efficacy and safety of vutrisiran to patisiran. 164 ATTRv amyloidosis patients were randomized 3:1 to subcutaneous vutrisiran 25 mg every 3 months or patisiran 0.3 mg/kg IV infusion every 3 weeks for 18 months' treatment period to be followed by a lengthier extension period. The study used the placebo arm of the APOLLO study (NCT01960348) as an external comparator for the primary and most other efficacy end points. The primary endpoints of the study are the change from baseline in modified Neuropathy Impairment Score mNIS+7 and Norfolk Quality of Life-Diabetic Neuropathy QOL-DN score. Secondary endpoints include measures of mobility, BMI, disability, and serum TTR. Vutrisiran met the primary endpoints at 9 months, which were maintained through 18 month. It also met all secondary efficacy endpoints. Additionally, patients in HELIOS-A showed improvement across exploratory cardiac end points. Vutrisiran treatment resulted in rapid (≤3 weeks) and sustained reduction in serum TTR levels over 18 months, similar to what was observed in the patisiran group. Following 18 months of vutrisiran treatment, steady-state mean (SD) peak and trough serum TTR reductions from baseline were 87.6% and 81.0%, respectively. The fluctuation between median steady-state peak and trough values was lower with vutrisiran compared with patisiran, which was reflected in the reduced variability in TTR reduction (smaller standard error) observed at most time points with vutrisiran. Serum TTR reduction with vutrisiran was also similar across all patient subgroups. As expected from previous studies, serum vitamin A levels were reduced in parallel with reductions in serum TTR levels in both treatment groups. The extent of the reduction in TTR was not affected by TTR genotype (45.1% of participants were V30M and 54.9% had 1 of 24 other mutations), or patient age, sex, body weight or race. A subcutaneous dose of 25 mg vutrisiran every 3 months caused similar or greater efficacy than patisiran given as IV infusion three times a week. Vutrisiran significantly improved multiple disease-relevant outcomes versus placebo, with an acceptable safety profile. These findings from HELIOS-A resulted in FDA and EMA approval of vutrisiran for treatment of ATTRv-PN. The ongoing extension period of HELIOS-A will assess long-term safety and efficacy with continued Q3M vutrisiran treatment, or an alternative every 6 months dosing regimen. The estimated completion date is May 2024.

A study whose results are awaited is the phase III HELIOS-B (NCT04153149) randomized, double-blind, placebo-controlled trial, in which patients with TTR-related amyloid heart disease, both wild-type and mutated forms, are enrolled to evaluate the possible effects of the drug in terms of cardiac involvement. The estimated completion date is June 2025. Patients are randomized on a 1:1 basis to receive 25 mg of vutrisiran or placebo administered as a subcutaneous injection once every 3 months for up to 36 months. The primary end point will evaluate the efficacy of vutrisiran in the composite outcome of reducing all-cause mortality and recurrent cardiovascular hospitalization. Secondary endpoints include measures of functional exercise capacity, self-perception of health status, and cardiac structure and function.

=== Safety ===
Vutrisiran is well tolerated and has an acceptable safety profile. In contrast to patisiran, patients do not require premedication, although all patients require vitamin A supplementation. The majority of adverse events in the phase I trial of vutrisiran were mild, and included nasopharyngitis, headache, diarrhoea and nausea, and injection site reactions. HELIOS-A trial also reported encouraging safety and tolerability, with the majority of adverse events being mild or moderate 10 and no drug- related discontinuations or deaths occurred. Only two serious adverse events were attributed to vutrisiran—dyslipidaemia and urinary tract infection. AEs occurring in (≥ 10%) of patients receiving vutrisiran included falls, pain in extremity, diarrhea, peripheral edema, urinary tract infection, arthralgia, and dizziness; all of which, except pain in extremity and arthralgia, occurred at a similar or lower rate than in the external placebo group. There were no cardiac AEs related to vutrisiran in the safety population. Five patients (4.1%) who received vutrisiran reported mild and transient injection site reactions (ISRs). There were no safety signals regarding liver function tests, haematology, or renal function related to vutrisiran. Four vutrisiran recipients (3.3%) developed antidrug antibodies (ADAs) that were low and transient with no evidence of an effect on clinical efficacy, safety, pharmacokinetics or pharmacodynamic parameters. No clinically significant changes in laboratory measures, vital signs, physical examinations, or electrocardiogram were noted.

== Society and culture ==
=== Legal status ===
In July 2022, the Committee for Medicinal Products for Human Use (CHMP) of the European Medicines Agency (EMA) adopted a positive opinion, recommending the granting of a marketing authorization for the medicinal product Amvuttra, intended for treatment of hereditary transthyretin-mediated (hATTR) amyloidosis. Amvuttra was designated as an orphan medicinal product in May 2018. The applicant for this medicinal product is Alnylam Netherlands B.V. Vutrisiran was approved for medical use in the European Union in September 2022.

Vutrisiran is under regulatory review for the treatment of polyneuropathy of hATTR amyloidosis in adults in Japan and Brazil, and is being investigated in amyloidosis with cardiomyopathy in the ongoing phase III, HELIOS-B trial.

=== Names ===
Vutrisiran is the international nonproprietary name (INN).

=== Formulations ===
Vutrisiran is available as the sodium salt, in solution in a single-dose prefilled syringe of 25 mg/0.5 mL under the brand name Amvuttra.
