= Amyloid cardiomyopathy =

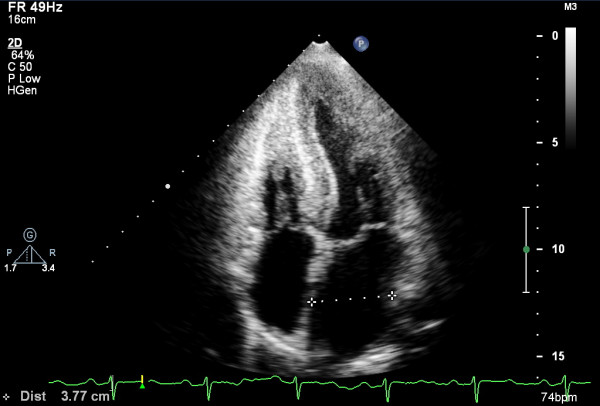
- Apparent left ventricular hypertrophy and "snowstorm" appearance of the myocardium are suggestive of an infiltrative cardiomyopathy.
- Specialty: Cardiology
- Symptoms: diastolic dysfunction, congestive heart failure, arrhythmia, cardiac nervous conduction block, fatigue, dyspnea.
- Complications: Congestive heart failure, atrial arrhythmia, ventricular arrhythmia, and blockage of cardiac nervous conduction.
- Diagnostic method: Electrocardiography and Cardiac mri
- Treatment: Chemotherapy or liver transplant
- Prognosis: 5-year survival rate of 10%

Amyloid cardiomyopathy (stiff heart syndrome) is a condition resulting in the death of part of the myocardium (heart muscle). It is associated with the systemic production and release of many amyloidogenic proteins, especially immunoglobulin light chain or transthyretin (TTR). It can be characterized by the extracellular deposition of amyloids, foldable proteins that stick together to build fibrils in the heart.

== Symptoms ==
Amyloid cardiomyopathy is associated with a number of symptoms:

- diastolic dysfunction
- congestive heart failure
- arrhythmia
- cardiac nervous conduction block
- fatigue
- dyspnea

== Pathophysiology ==
Amyloid proteins are deposited in the myocardium. This limits ventricular filling during diastole, which increases end-diastolic volume. This can lead to a variety of cardiac issues, such as congestive heart failure, atrial arrhythmia, ventricular arrhythmia, and blocks to cardiac nervous conduction.

== Diagnosis ==
Diagnosis is often delayed, because its symptoms are non-specific. However, recent work has shown that there are sentinel events (risk factors) which may predispose individuals to ATTR-related cardiomyopathy, including:

- Carpal tunnel syndrome, specifically bilateral disease
- Multidigit stenosing tenovagnitisi of the fingers ("Trigger finger")
- Achilles rupture
- Glaucoma

Electrocardiography can be used to identify low voltage and patterns similar to those of a heart attack.

Cardiac MRI can be used to distinguish it from hypertensive heart disease. This shows a thicker interventricular septum.

== Treatment ==
Chemotherapy can treat amyloidosis if it is related to immunoglobulins. Liver transplant can treat amyloidosis if it is related to familial transthyretin.

Acoramidis (Attruby) was approved for medical use in the United States in November 2024, to treat adults with cardiomyopathy of wild-type or variant (hereditary) transthyretin-mediated amyloidosis (ATTR-CM) to reduce death and hospitalization related to heart problems.

== Prognosis ==
Outcomes for amyloid cardiomyopathy are generally very poor, with fewer than 10% of patients surviving more than 5 years. Without treatment, few patients survive more than 6 months.

== Epidemiology ==
In developed countries, amyloid cardiomyopathy is estimated to be involved in 0.1% of deaths.
