= Jeffery W. Kelly =

American businessman and chemist (born 1960)

- Born: August 23, 1960 (age 66); Medina, New York, U.S.
- Education: University of North Carolina at Chapel Hill; State University of New York at Fredonia
- Awards: Breakthrough Prize in Life Sciences (2022); Wolf Prize (2023)
- Scientific career
- Workplaces: Scripps Research Institute

Jeffery W. Kelly (born August 23, 1960, in Medina, New York) is an American businessman and chemist who is on the faculty of the Scripps Research Institute in La Jolla, California.

== Biography ==
Kelly attended State University of New York at Fredonia, graduating in 1982. He received his Ph.D. in organic chemistry from the University of North Carolina at Chapel Hill (1986) and performed post-doctoral research at The Rockefeller University (1986–89).

He is former Dean of Graduate Studies (2000–2008) and Vice President of Academic Affairs (2000–2006) and co-chairman of Molecular Medicine and the Lita Annenberg Hazen Professor of Chemistry within the Skaggs Institute of Chemical Biology at The Scripps Research Institute in La Jolla, California. His research focuses on understanding protein folding, misfolding and aggregation and on developing both chemical and biological strategies to ameliorate diseases caused by protein misfolding and/or aggregation.

Kelly has cofounded three biotechnology companies, FoldRx Pharmaceuticals with Susan Lindquist in 2003, Proteostasis Therapeutics, Inc. with Andrew Dillin and Richard Morimoto in 2010, and Misfolding Diagnostics in 2012.

His lab began looking for ways to inhibit transthyretin fibril formation in the 1990s. Tafamidis was eventually discovered by Kelly's team using a structure-based drug design strategy; the structure was first published in 2003. In 2003 Kelly co-founded FoldRx with Susan Lindquist of MIT and the Whitehead Institute and FoldRx developed tafamidis up through submitting an application for marketing approval in Europe in early 2010. FoldRx was acquired by Pfizer later that year.

== Honors and awards ==
- 1991 - Searle Scholar Award
- 1999 - Biophysical Society National Lecturer (Award)
- 1999 - Protein Society-Dupont Young Investigator Award
- 2000 - SUNY at Fredonia Alumni Distinguished Achievement Award
- 2001 - American Chemical Society Arthur C. Cope Scholar Award
- 2006 - National Institutes of Health Merit Award
- 2008 - American Peptide Society Vincent du Vigneaud Award
- 2011 - American Peptide Society Rao Makineni Lectureship (Award)
- 2011 - Protein Society Emil T. Kaiser Award
- 2012 - American Chemical Society, Ralph F. Hirschmann Award in Peptide Chemistry
- 2012 - the Biopolymers Murray Goodman Memorial Prize
- 2016 - Royal Society of Chemistry Jeremy Knowles Award
- 2016 - Jacob Heskel Gabbay Award in Biotechnology and Medicine
- 2016 - Commencement address at SUNY Fredonia.
- 2016 - Member of the American Academy of Arts and Sciences
- 2017 - Chemical Pioneer Award of the American Institute of Chemists
- 2017 - Fellow of the Royal Society of Chemistry
- 2017 - Fellow of the National Academy of Inventors
- 2022 - Breakthrough Prize in Life Sciences
- 2023 - Wolf Prize in Chemistry
- 2026 - Canada Gairdner International Award

== Significant Papers ==
- 1992 Colon, W.; Kelly, J.W. "Partial Denaturation of Transthyretin is Sufficient for Amyloid Fibril Formation In Vitro." Biochemistry, 31 8654–8660.
- 2001 Jager, M.; Nguyen, H.; Crane, J.C.; Kelly, J.W.; Gruebele, M. "The Folding Mechanism of a β-Sheet: The WW Domain" J. Mol. Biol., 311, 373–393.
- 2001 Hammarstrom, P.; Schneider, F.; Kelly, J.W. "Trans-Suppression of Misfolding In An Amyloid Disease" Science 293, 2459–2461.
- 2002 Sawkar, A.R.; Cheng, W-C.; Beutler, E.: Wong, C.–H.: Balch, W.E.: Kelly, J.W. "Chemical Chaperones Increase the Cellular Activity of N370S β-glucosidase: A Therapeutic Strategy for Gaucher Disease " Proc. Natl. Acad. Sci. 99, 15428–15433.
- 2003 Hammarstrom, P.; Wiseman, R. L.; Powers, E.T.; Kelly, J.W. "Prevention of Transthyretin Amyloid Disease by Changing Protein Misfolding Energetics" Science 299, 713–716.
- 2004 Deechongkit, S.; Nguyen, H.; Dawson, P.E.; Gruebele, M.; Kelly, J.W. “Context Dependent Contributions of Backbone H-Bonding to β-Sheet Folding Energetics” Nature 430, 101–105.
- 2005 Sekijima, Y., Wiseman, R.L., Matteson, J., Hammarström, P., Miller, S.R., Balch, W.E., Kelly, J.W. “Biological and Chemical Basis for Tissue Selective Amyloid Disease”Cell 121, 73-85.
- 2006 Fowler, D.M.; Koulov, A.V.; Alory-Jost, C.; Marks, M.S.; Balch, W.E; Kelly, J.W. "Functional Amyloid Formation Within Mammalian Tissue " PLoS Biology 4, 100–107.
- 2008 Mu, T-W.; Ong, D.S.T.; Wang, Y-J; Balch, W. E.; Yates, J.R.; Segatori, L.; Kelly, J.W. .”Chemical and Biological Approaches Synergize to Ameliorate Protein-Folding Diseases” Cell 134, 769–781.
- 2008 Balch, W.E.; Morimoto, R.I.; Dillin, A.; Kelly, J.W. “Adapting Proteostasis For Disease Intervention” Science 319, 916–919.
- 2010 Wiley; died in a car crash
- 2011 Culyba, E.K.; Price, J.L.; Hanson, S.R.; Dhar, A.; Wong, C-H.; Gruebele, M.; Powers, E.T.; Kelly, J.W. “Protein Native State Stabilization by Placing Aromatic Side Chains in N-Glycosylated Reverse Turns” Science 331, 571–575.
- 2012 Bulawa, C.E.; Connelly, S.; DeVit, M.; Wang, L. Weigel, C.;Fleming, J. Packman, J.; Powers, E.T.; Wiseman, R.L.; Foss, T.R.; Wilson, I.A.; Kelly, J.W.; Labaudiniere, R. “Tafamidis, A Potent and Selective Transthyretin Kinetic Stabilizer That Inhibits the Amyloid Cascade” Proc. Natl. Acad. Sci. 109, 9629–9634.
- 2013 Chen, W; Enck, S.; Price, J.L.; Powers, D.L.; Powers, E.T.; Wong, C-H.; Dyson, H.J.; Kelly, J.W. “The Structural and Energetic Basis of Protein-Carbohydrate Interactions” J. Am. Chem. Soc. 135, 9877–9884.
