= Net treatment benefit =

Net Treatment Benefit (NTB) is a statistical measure of treatment effect used in randomized clinical trials. The concept builds on the development of methods for comparing treatment outcomes using pairwise comparisons. Finkelstein and Schoenfeld (1999) proposed a method for combining mortality and longitudinal outcomes in clinical trials using a hierarchical comparison rule. Marc Buyse subsequently formalized generalized pairwise comparisons (GPC) for prioritized outcomes and introduced a general treatment-effect measure called the ‘‘proportion in favor of treatment’’, denoted by Δ.

Over time, related treatment-effect measures based on pairwise comparisons have been described using several terms, including ‘‘proportion in favor of treatment’’, ‘‘global treatment effect’’, ‘‘net chance of a better outcome’’, and ‘‘Net Benefit’’. The term ‘‘Net Treatment Benefit’’ (NTB) has also been adopted in more recent publications. Its formal definition and interpretation are presented in the ‘‘Handbook of Generalized Pairwise Comparisons: Methods for Patient-Centric Analysis’’ (pp. 40–41).

Net Treatment Benefit can summarize treatment effects across multiple clinically relevant outcomes, including efficacy, safety and patient-reported outcomes, while preserving their relative clinical importance through pre-specified prioritization.

== Definition ==
For two treatment groups, experimental (E) and control (C), the Net Treatment Benefit is defined as the difference between the probabilities of favorable and unfavorable pairwise comparisons:

$\Delta_\tau := P(Y_E \succ_\tau Y_C) - P(Y_E \prec_\tau Y_C) \equiv P_\tau^F - P_\tau^U$

Here, $Y_E$ and $Y_C$ denote the outcomes of patients in the experimental and control groups, respectively. The comparison operators $\succ_\tau$ and $\prec_\tau$ indicate a more favorable or less favorable outcome, respectively, according to the prespecified comparison rule. The subscript $\tau$ allows for a threshold or other specified nuance in the comparison. $P_\tau^F$ and $P_\tau^U$ denote the probabilities of favorable and unfavorable comparisons, respectively.

The NTB ranges from −1 to +1. A value of zero indicates no net treatment advantage. Positive values favor the experimental treatment, whereas negative values favor the control treatment.

== Interpretation ==
NTB is an absolute measure of treatment effect with a probabilistic interpretation.

For example, an NTB of 0.15 indicates a 15-percentage-point difference between the probability of a favorable comparison and the probability of an unfavorable comparison in favor of the experimental treatment, according to the prespecified comparison rules.

When multiple outcomes are prioritized, the comparison reflects the overall treatment effect according to the prespecified hierarchy of outcomes. Patients are first compared on the highest-priority outcome, with lower-priority outcomes considered when higher-priority outcomes do not distinguish between them.

This approach can be used in analyses involving hierarchical composite endpoints (HCEs), in which multiple outcomes are assessed according to a prespecified hierarchy. NTB is a measure of treatment effect that can be used in such analyses, rather than an endpoint itself.

Because NTB is expressed on an absolute probability scale, its reciprocal has been proposed as a number needed to treat for treatment comparisons involving multiple prioritized outcomes.

Because NTB is expressed on an absolute probability scale, its reciprocal has been proposed as a number needed to treat for the comparison of treatment effects on several prioritized outcomes.

== Comparison with the Win Ratio ==
The Win ratio is another summary measure of treatment effect derived from generalized pairwise comparisons for multiple prioritized outcomes.

The two measures of treatment effect are based on the same pairwise comparisons, therefore tests of statistical significance are identical for the two measures. The win ratio is calculated as the ratio of favorable to unfavorable comparisons after excluding neutral pairs, whereas NTB is calculated as the difference between the probabilities of favorable and unfavorable comparisons.

Because NTB is expressed as an absolute probability difference, it has a direct probabilistic interpretation. Unlike the Win Ratio, NTB does not ignore neutral comparisons, it eliminates them by subtraction.

Unlike the Win Ratio, Net Treatment Benefit provides a transparent measure of the individual contribution of each outcome in the overall assessment of treatment effect. Authors have discussed limitations of the win ratio as a measure of treatment effect.

== Applications ==
NTB has been applied in clinical trials evaluating treatments across a range of therapeutic areas, including oncology, cardiovascular disease and rare diseases.

Because it can jointly evaluate efficacy, safety and patient-reported outcomes within a single measure of treatment effect, NTB has also been proposed for benefit-risk assessment, patient-centered endpoint design and dose optimization in clinical development.

In line with the idea that clinical trials should ask “which treatment is better for patients?”, the Net Treatment Benefit changes the study objective from proving non-inferiority of efficacy alone to demonstrating superiority in overall patient benefit across multiple prioritized efficacy and safety outcomes.

== Limitations ==
The interpretation of NTB (and Win Ratio) depends on the comparison rules specified before the analysis, including the choice of outcomes, their order of priority and any thresholds defining clinically meaningful differences. NTB may differ across patient populations with different baseline risks; hence, the NTB estimated in a specific sample of patients does not generalize to different patient populations.

As with other measures of treatment effect, estimates may differ across study populations with different baseline risks. Calculation, including inferential statistics, may also become computationally intensive in large studies because every patient in one treatment group is compared with every patient in the other.
