= Diflunisal =

NSAID analgesic and anti-inflammatory drug

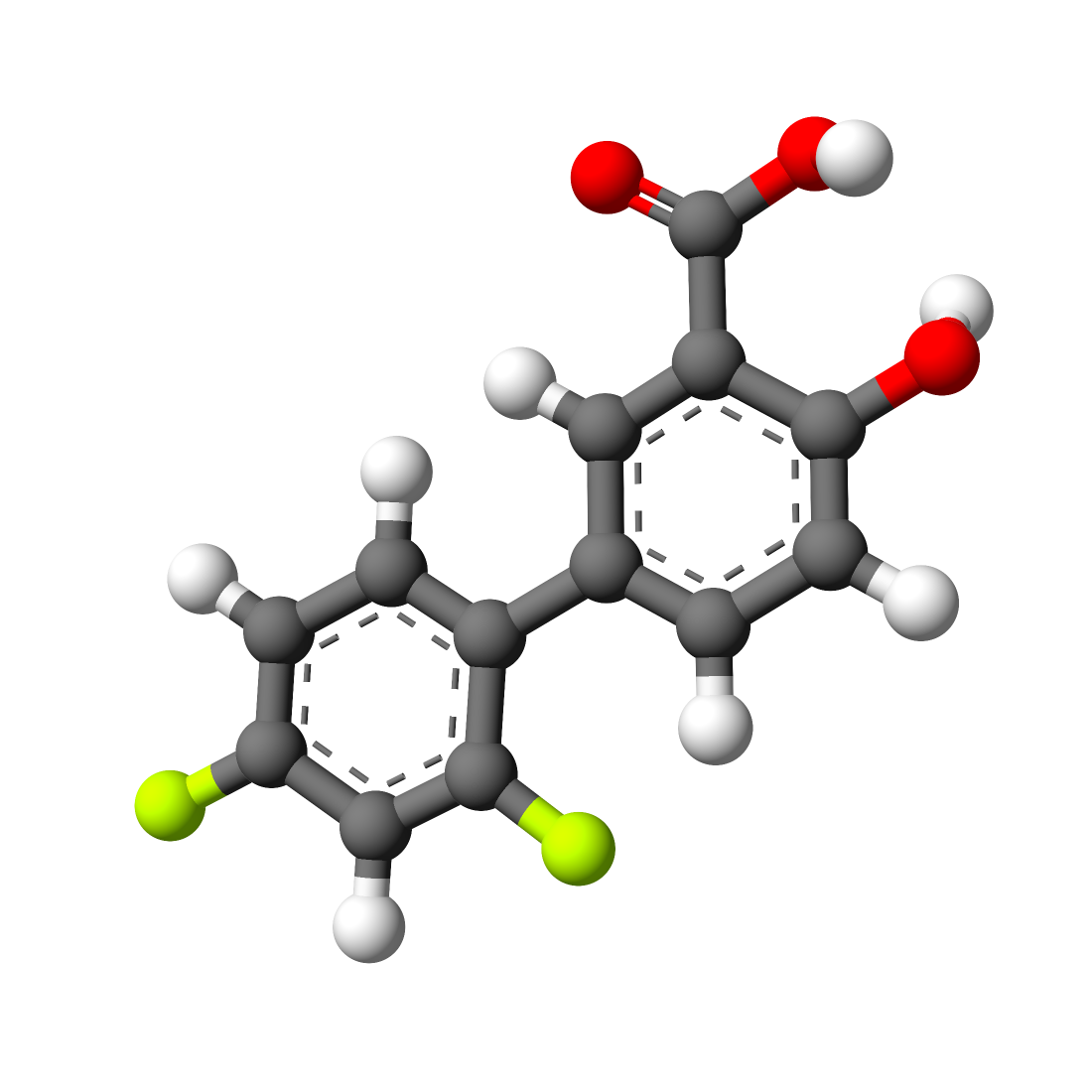

Clinical data
- Trade names: Dolobid
- Other names: MK647
- AHFS/Drugs.com: Monograph
- MedlinePlus: a684037
- License data: US DailyMed: Diflunisal
- Pregnancy category: AU: C
- Routes of administration: By mouth
- ATC code: N02BA11 (WHO)

Legal status
- Legal status: AU: S4 (Prescription only); UK: POM (Prescription only); US: ℞-only; EU: Rx-only

Pharmacokinetic data
- Bioavailability: 80-90%
- Protein binding: >99%
- Metabolism: Liver
- Elimination half-life: 8 to 12 hours
- Excretion: Kidney

Identifiers
- IUPAC name: 2',4'-difluoro-4-hydroxybiphenyl-3-carboxylic acid
- CAS Number: 22494-42-4
- PubChem CID: 3059
- IUPHAR/BPS: 7162
- DrugBank: DB00861
- ChemSpider: 2951
- UNII: 7C546U4DEN
- KEGG: D00130
- ChEBI: CHEBI:39669
- ChEMBL: ChEMBL898
- PDB ligand: 1FL (PDBe, RCSB PDB)
- CompTox Dashboard (EPA): DTXSID5022932
- ECHA InfoCard: 100.040.925

Chemical and physical data
- Formula: C_{13}H_{8}F_{2}O_{3}
- Molar mass: 250.201 g·mol^{−1}
- 3D model (JSmol): Interactive image
- SMILES: O=C(O)c1cc(ccc1O)c2ccc(F)cc2F
- InChI: InChI=1S/C13H8F2O3/c14-8-2-3-9(11(15)6-8)7-1-4-12(16)10(5-7)13(17)18/h1-6,16H,(H,17,18); Key:HUPFGZXOMWLGNK-UHFFFAOYSA-N

Diflunisal is a salicylic acid derivative with analgesic and anti-inflammatory activity. It was developed by Merck Sharp & Dohme in 1971, after showing promise in a research project studying more potent chemical analogs of aspirin. It was first sold under the brand name Dolobid, by Merck & Co., but generic versions are widely available. It is classed as a nonsteroidal anti-inflammatory drug (NSAID) and is available in 250 mg and 500 mg tablets.

== Medical uses ==
Diflunisal is indicated for acute or long-term use for symptomatic treatment of mild to moderate pain, osteoarthritis, and rheumatoid arthritis.

== Contraindications ==
- Hypersensitivity to aspirin/NSAID-induced asthma (AERD) or urticaria
- 3rd trimester pregnancy
- Coronary artery bypass surgery (peri-op pain)

=== Amyloidosis ===
Both diflunisal and several of its analogues have been shown to be inhibitors of transthyretin-related hereditary amyloidosis, a disease which currently has few treatment options. Phase I trials have shown the drug to be well tolerated, with a small Phase II trial (double-blind, placebo-controlled, 130 patients for 2 years) in 2013 showing a reduced rate of disease progression and preserved quality of life.

== Side effects ==
In October 2020, the US Food and Drug Administration (FDA) required the prescribing information to be updated for all nonsteroidal anti-inflammatory medications to describe the risk of kidney problems in unborn babies that result in low amniotic fluid. They recommend avoiding NSAIDs in pregnant women at 20 weeks or later in pregnancy.

== Mechanism of action ==
Diflunisal acts by inhibiting the production of prostaglandins, hormones which are involved in inflammation and pain. Diflunisal also has an antipyretic effect, but this is not a recommended use of the drug.

It has been found to inhibit p300 and CREB-binding protein (CBP), which are epigenetic regulators that control the levels of proteins that cause inflammation or are involved in cell growth.

== Duration of effect ==
Though diflunisal has an onset time of 1 hour, and maximum analgesia at 2 to 3 hours, the plasma levels of diflunisal will not be steady until repeated doses are taken. The long plasma half-life is a distinctive feature of diflunisal in comparison to similar drugs. To increase the rate at which the diflunisal plasma levels become steady, a loading dose is usually used. It is primarily used to treat symptoms of arthritis, and for acute pain following oral surgery, especially removal of wisdom teeth.

== Society and culture ==
=== Legal status ===
In April 2025, the Committee for Medicinal Products for Human Use of the European Medicines Agency adopted a positive opinion, recommending the granting of a marketing authorization for the medicinal product Attrogy, intended for the treatment of hereditary transthyretin-mediated amyloidosis in adults with stage 1 or stage 2 polyneuropathy. The applicant for this medicinal product is Purpose Pharma International AB. Diflunisal was authorized for medical use in the European Union in July 2025.

== Research ==
Diflunisal may have some antibacterial activity in vitro against Francisella tularensis live vaccine strain (LVS).
