= Familial amyloid cardiomyopathy =

Disease of the human heart muscle

- Specialty: Cardiology

Familial amyloid cardiomyopathy (FAC), or transthyretin amyloid cardiomyopathy, also called ATTR-CM is a heart muscle disease. A misshapen protein, transthyretin, builds up in the heart. It can also affect the nerves and other parts of the body. The condition is potentially fatal and often underdiagnosed. It causes stiffening of the walls of the heart, especially affecting the left ventricle, leading to cardiomyopathy and eventually heart failure.

The condition results from the aggregation and deposition of mutant and wild-type transthyretin (TTR) protein in the heart. TTR is usually circulated as a homo-tetramer—a protein made up of four identical subunits—however, in FAC populations, TTR dissociates from this typical form and misassembles into amyloid fibrils which are insoluble and resistant to degradation. Due to this resistance to degradation, when amyloid fibrils accumulate in the heart's walls, specifically the left ventricle, rigidity prevents the heart from properly relaxing and refilling with blood: this is called diastolic dysfunction, which can ultimately lead to heart failure.

== Types ==
There are two types of ATTR-CM: Hereditary (hATTR-CM) and wild type (wATTR-CM).

Both mutant and wild-type transthyretin comprise the aggregates because the TTR blood protein is a tetramer composed of mutant and wild-type TTR subunits in heterozygotes. Several mutations in TTR are associated with FAC, including V122I, V20I, P24S, A45T, Gly47Val, Glu51Gly, I68L, Gln92Lys, and L111M. One common mutation (V122I), which is a substitution of isoleucine for valine at position 122, occurs with high frequency in African-Americans, with a prevalence of approximately 3.5%. FAC is clinically similar to senile systemic amyloidosis, in which cardiomyopathy results from the aggregation of wild-type transthyretin exclusively.

== Presentation ==
The onset of FAC caused by aggregation of the V122I mutation and wild-type TTR, and senile systemic amyloidosis caused by the exclusive aggregation of wild-type TTR, typically occur after age 60. Greater than 40% of these patients present with carpal tunnel syndrome before developing ATTR-CM. Cardiac involvement is often identified with the presence of conduction system disease (sinus node or atrioventricular node dysfunction) and/or congestive heart failure, including shortness of breath, peripheral edema, syncope, exertional dyspnea, generalized fatigue, or heart block. Unfortunately, echocardiographic findings are indistinguishable from those seen in AL amyloidosis, and include thickened ventricular walls (concentric hypertrophy, both right and left) with a normal-to-small left ventricular cavity, increased myocardial echogenicity, normal or mildly reduced ejection fraction (often with evidence of diastolic dysfunction and severe impairment of contraction along the longitudinal axis), and bi-atrial dilation with impaired atrial contraction. Unlike the situation in AL amyloidosis, the ECG voltage is often normal, although low voltage may be seen (despite increased wall thickness on echocardiography). Marked axis deviation, bundle branch block, and AV block are common, as is atrial fibrillation.

== Management ==
Although not based on a human clinical trial, the only currently accepted disease-modifying therapeutic strategy available for familial amyloid cardiomyopathy is a combined liver and heart transplant. Treatments aimed at symptom relief are available, and include diuretics, pacemakers, and arrhythmia management. Thus, Senile systemic amyloidosis and familial amyloid polyneuropathy are often treatable diseases that are misdiagnosed.

== See also ==
- Amyloid
- Transthyretin
- Senile systemic amyloidosis
- Restrictive cardiomyopathy
