= Sirius Red =

Names
- IUPAC name Hexasodium (3E)-4-oxo-7-[[(6E)-5-oxo-7-sulfonato-6-[[2-sulfonato-4-[(4-sulfonatophenyl)diazenyl]phenyl]hydrazinylidene]naphthalen-2-yl]carbamoylamino]-3-[[2-sulfonato-4-[(4-sulfonatophenyl)diazenyl]phenyl]hydrazinylidene]naphthalene-2-sulfonate
- Other names Direct Red 80; Picrosirius Red

Identifiers
CAS Number	2610-10-8
3D model (JSmol)	Interactive image
ChemSpider	7845597
ECHA InfoCard	100.018.208
EC Number	220-027-3
PubChem CID	9571131
UNII	1294D5G72N
CompTox Dashboard (EPA)	DTXSID8044628
- InChI: InChI=1S/C45H32N10O21S6.6Na/c56-43-33-13-5-27(17-23(33)19-39(81(71,72)73)41(43)54-52-35-15-7-29(21-37(35)79(65,66)67)50-48-25-1-9-31(10-2-25)77(59,60)61)46-45(58)47-28-6-14-34-24(18-28)20-40(82(74,75)76)42(44(34)57)55-53-36-16-8-30(22-38(36)80(68,69)70)51-49-26-3-11-32(12-4-26)78(62,63)64;;;;;;/h1-22,52-53H,(H2,46,47,58)(H,59,60,61)(H,62,63,64)(H,65,66,67)(H,68,69,70)(H,71,72,73)(H,74,75,76);;;;;;/q;6*+1/p-6/b50-48?,51-49?,54-41-,55-42-;;;;;; Key: LDCKXVAPQFUIOI-ZFLDVXHKSA-H
- SMILES: C1=CC(=CC=C1N=NC2=CC(=C(C=C2)N/N=C/3\C(=O)C4=C(C=C3S(=O)(=O)[O-])C=C(C=C4)NC(=O)NC5=CC6=C(C(=O)/C(=N\NC7=C(C=C(C=C7)N=NC8=CC=C(C=C8)S(=O)(=O)[O-])S(=O)(=O)[O-])/C(=C6)S(=O)(=O)[O-])C=C5)S(=O)(=O)[O-])S(=O)(=O)[O-].[Na+].[Na+].[Na+].[Na+].[Na+].[Na+]

Properties
Chemical formula	C_{45}H_{26}N_{10}Na_{6}O_{21}S_{6}
Molar mass	1373.05 g·mol^{−1}
- Except where otherwise noted, data are given for materials in their standard state (at 25 °C [77 °F], 100 kPa). Infobox references

Sirius Red F 3B (Direct Red 80) is an azo dye primarily used in staining methods for collagen and amyloid. It has the molecular formula C_{45}H_{26}N_{10}Na_{6}O_{21}S_{6}.

In histology, sirius red staining is used in various domains of diagnostic to observe fibrosis levels in a lot of cases of inflammation induced by cancer, vascular or metabolic pathologies.

In bright-field microscopy the following can be observed:

- The nuclei in yellow
- The cytoplasm in yellow
- Collagen fibers in red
- Muscular fibers in yellow
- Red blood cells in yellow

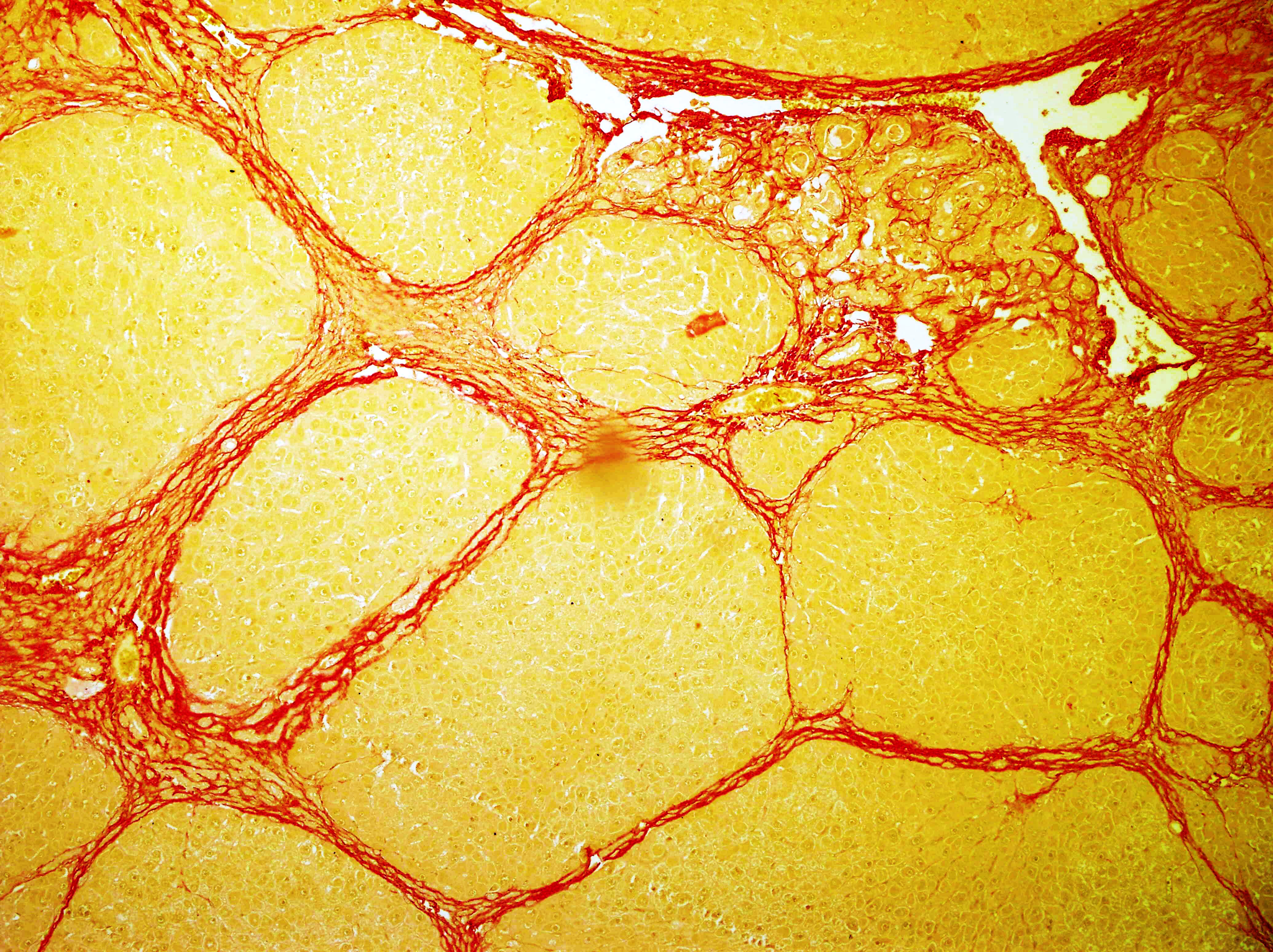
Sirius red staining in rat liver, where the red color indicates collagen deposition

== See also ==
- Collagen Hybridizing Peptide, a peptide that stains denatured collagen in tissues
