= Generalized pairwise comparisons =

Statistical methodology

Generalized pairwise comparisons (GPC) is a non-parametric statistical methodology for comparing treatments or interventions in clinical trials using one or more outcomes simultaneously. The method is an extension of classical pairwise comparison procedures, including the Wilcoxon rank-sum test and the Mann–Whitney U test, allowing comparisons to incorporate outcomes of different types, such as survival time, binary events and continuous measurements.

GPC compares every participant in one treatment group with every participant in the other treatment group. Each comparison is classified as favorable, unfavorable or neutral according to pre-specified clinical criteria. The results of all pairwise comparisons are then combined into summary measures of treatment effect.By allowing flexible and clinically meaningful comparison rules, GPC can simultaneously account for multiple outcomes that contribute to the overall assessment of treatment benefit. In many clinical trials, treatments may improve one outcome while worsening another, making the combined interpretation of conventional analyses based on a single endpoint and traditional composite endpoint difficult. GPC provides a framework for incorporating multiple outcomes while preserving their relative clinical importance through hierarchical prioritization or relative weighting.

== History ==
Generalized pairwise comparisons were introduced by Marc Buyse in 2010 as an extension of rank-based pairwise comparison methods such as the Wilcoxon rank-sum test and the Mann–Whitney U test. The methodology was developed to accommodate multiple prioritized outcomes, clinically meaningful thresholds and outcomes of different types within a unified analytical framework.

== Methodology ==
Pairwise comparison methods have a long history in statistics. The Wilcoxon rank-sum test, introduced by Frank Wilcoxon in 1945, and the closely related Mann–Whitney U test developed two years later, compare two independent groups without assuming normally distributed data.Although widely used, classical rank-based methods were developed primarily for analyzing a single outcome. Nowadays, clinical trials increasingly evaluate treatments using multiple outcomes, including measures of efficacy, safety, quality of life and survival.

Conventional approaches typically analyze these outcomes separately or combine them into composite endpoints. Separate analyses may produce conflicting conclusions, while composite endpoints require combining events often of speculative clinical importance into a single variable.Subsequent methodological developments extended the approach to accommodate censored survival data, clinically meaningful thresholds, competing risks and stratified analyses.

Generalized pairwise comparisons evaluate treatment effect by comparing every participant receiving one treatment with every participant receiving the comparator treatment. For two treatment groups containing n and m participants, the analysis considers all n × m possible patient pairs.For each pair, outcomes are compared according to predefined decision rules. If the participant receiving the experimental treatment has a better outcome than the participant receiving the control treatment, the comparison is considered favorable. If the opposite is true, the comparison is unfavorable. When neither participant can be considered to have a better outcome according to the predefined criteria, the comparison is classified as neutral. Unlike conventional rank tests, GPC is not restricted to a single outcome. Multiple outcomes may be incorporated using weighted or hierarchical approaches, including analyses of hierarchical composite endpoints:

- In a weighted approach, each outcome contributes to the comparison according to a predetermined weight reflecting its relative importance.
- More commonly, GPC uses a hierarchical or prioritized approach. A hierarchical composite endpoint (HCE) combines multiple clinically relevant outcomes into a single analysis by specifying an order of priority among those outcomes. In a hierarchical analysis using GPC, each patient pair is first compared on the highest-priority outcome, with lower-priority outcomes considered only when the higher-priority outcome does not distinguish between the patients. This allows outcomes such as mortality, disease progression, safety and patient-reported outcomes to be evaluated according to their pre-specified clinical importance, rather than treating all components as equally important.

Clinical relevance thresholds may also be incorporated. Rather than considering any numerical difference between patients to represent a treatment benefit, it is possible to specify a minimum clinically important difference that must be exceeded before a comparison is judged favorable or unfavorable. Differences smaller than the threshold are treated as neutral.Because GPC is based on pairwise comparisons rather than assumptions about the distribution of outcome variables, it generally requires fewer distributional assumptions than many parametric statistical methods. However, appropriate interpretation depends on the predefined comparison rules, outcome priorities and estimand selected before the analysis.

== Measures of treatment effect ==
Several measures of treatment effect can be derived from generalized pairwise comparisons, all of which are based on the proportion of favorable and unfavorable patient pairs.

- The Net Treatment Benefit is calculated as the difference between the probability of a favorable comparison and the probability of an unfavorable comparison.
- The probabilistic index estimates the probability that a randomly selected participant receiving the experimental treatment has a more favorable outcome than a randomly selected participant receiving the control treatment, with ties contributing equally to both groups.
- The win ratio expresses the ratio of favorable to unfavorable patient pairs after excluding ties.
- Closely related measures include the win odds and success odds.

Although these measures are mathematically related, they differ in interpretation and statistical properties. The choice of estimand depends on the objectives of the analysis and the study design.

== Limitations ==
The methodology has recognized limitations. The interpretation of results depends on decisions made before the analysis, including the choice of outcomes, their order of priority and any thresholds defining clinically meaningful differences. Different specifications may lead to different estimates of treatment effect, making pre-specification a critical aspect of study design.
