= Familial amyloid polyneuropathy =

- Other names: FAP, hereditary transthyretin amyloidosis (hATTR), Corino de Andrade's disease
- Familial amyloid polyneuropathy has an autosomal dominant pattern of inheritance.
- Specialty: Neurology
- Diagnostic method: Genetic testing
- Medication: Tafamidis, patisiran

Familial amyloid polyneuropathy, also called hereditary transthyretin amyloidosis (hATTR), or Corino de Andrade's disease, is an autosomal dominant neurodegenerative disease. It is a form of amyloidosis, and was first identified and described by Portuguese neurologist Mário Corino da Costa Andrade, in 1952. FAP is distinct from senile systemic amyloidosis (SSA), which is not inherited, and which was determined to be the primary cause of death for 70% of supercentenarians who have been autopsied. FAP can be ameliorated by liver transplantation.

== Presentation ==
Usually manifesting itself between 20 and 40 years of age, it is characterized by pain, paresthesia, muscular weakness and autonomic dysfunction. In its terminal state, the kidneys and the heart are affected. FAP is characterized by the systemic deposition of amyloidogenic variants of the transthyretin protein, especially in the peripheral nervous system, causing a progressive sensory and motor polyneuropathy.

== Cause ==
FAP is caused by a mutation of the TTR gene, located on human chromosome 18q12.1-11.2. A replacement of valine by methionine at position 30 (TTR V30M) is the mutation most commonly found in FAP. The transthyretin protein is a tetramer. The tetramer has to dissociate into misfolded monomers to aggregate into a variety of structures including amyloid fibrils. Because most patients are heterozygotes, they deposit both mutant and wild type TTR subunits.

FAP is inherited in an autosomal dominant manner. This means that the defective gene responsible for the disorder is located on an autosome (chromosome 18 is an autosome), and only one copy of the defective gene is sufficient to cause the disorder, when inherited from a parent who has the disorder.

== Diagnosis ==
Clinical suspicion for FAP is raised on the basis of a family history of neuropathy and physical exam showing signs of neuropathy. Diagnosis can be made using genetic testing to identify mutations in the TTR gene, but may include other corroborative investigation. Nerve conduction testing typically shows an axonal polyneuropathy, with sensory involvement greater than motor. Superimposed mononeuropathies may also be evident, such as a median mononeuropathy at the wrist (carpal tunnel syndrome). Electromyography (EMG) may show evidence of chronic denervation and reinnervation. Autonomic testing, including quantitative sweat testing, can reveal involvement of the autonomic nervous system. Occasionally, biopsy of skin, nerve, or muscle may be performed, which can show signs of denervation and amyloid deposition with response to anti-TTR antibodies. Additional testing should be performed to identify involvement of the heart or kidneys.

Sudomotor function through electrochemical skin conductance may provide a measure of subclinical autonomic involvement.

== Treatments ==
The medication tafamidis has been approved for the treatment of transthyretin familial amyloid polyneuropathy in Europe. Studies have found that it delays neurological problems when started early. The US Food and Drug Administration's Peripheral and Central Nervous System Drugs Advisory Committee rejected the drug in June 2012, in a 13–4 vote. The committee stated that there was not enough evidence supporting efficacy of the drug, and requested additional clinical trials. In May 2019, the FDA approved two tafamidis preparations for the treatment of transthyretin-mediated cardiomyopathy, but has not approved it for the treatment of transthyretin familial amyloid polyneuropathy.

In August 2018, the FDA approved patisiran, an siRNA-based treatment, at an expected cost of up to $450,000 per year.

In August 2021 six patients with hereditary ATTR amyloidosis with polyneuropathy were given doses of NTLA-2001, based on a CRISPR gene editing system. Researchers reported mild adverse events and decreases in serum misfolded transthyretin protein concentrations through targeted knockout.

Vutrisiran (Amvuttra) can be used for the treatment of the polyneuropathy caused by the disease; it was approved for medical use in the United States in June 2022, in the European Union in September 2022, and in Australia in June 2024.

In December 2023, eplontersen (Wainua) was approved for medical use in the United States, to treat the disease.

== Prognosis ==
In the absence of a liver transplant, FAP is invariably fatal, usually within a decade. The disadvantage of liver transplantation is that approximately 10% of the subjects die from the procedure or complications resulting from the procedure, which is a form of gene therapy wherein the liver expressing wild-type and mutant TTR is replaced by a liver only expressing wild-type TTR. Moreover, transplanted patients must take immune suppressants (medications) for the remainder of their life, which can lead to additional complications.

In late 2011, the European Medicines Agency approved the transthyretin kinetic stabilizer Tafamidis or Vyndaqel discovered by Jeffery W. Kelly and developed by FoldRx pharmaceuticals (acquired by Pfizer in 2010) for the treatment of FAP based on clinical trial data. Tafamidis (20 mg once daily) slowed the progression of FAP over a 36-month period and importantly reversed the weight loss and muscle wasting associated with disease progression.

== Epidemiology ==
This disease is endemic in Portuguese locations Póvoa de Varzim and Vila do Conde (Caxinas), with more than 1000 affected people, coming from about 500 families, where 70% of the people develop the illness. All the analysed Portuguese families presented the same haplotype (haplotype I) associated with the Met 30 mutation. In northern Sweden, more specifically Skellefteå (it is locally called Skelleftesjukan, the Skellefteå disease), 1.5% of the population has the mutated gene. There are many other populations in the world who exhibit the illness after having developed it independently.

The disease is somewhat prevalent in Cyprus. Mean age of onset was 46 years, and penetrance is estimated to be 28%, both of which differ from the Portuguese and Swedish populations.
