= Wild-type transthyretin amyloid =

Disease

Wild-type transthyretin amyloid (WTTA), also known as senile systemic amyloidosis (SSA), is a disease that typically affects the heart and tendons of elderly people. It is caused by the accumulation of a wild-type (that is to say a normal) protein called transthyretin. This is in contrast to a related condition called transthyretin-related hereditary amyloidosis where a genetically mutated transthyretin protein tends to deposit much earlier than in WTTA due to abnormal conformation and bioprocessing. It belongs to a group of diseases called amyloidosis, chronic progressive conditions linked to abnormal deposition of normal or abnormal proteins, because these proteins are misshapen and cannot be properly degraded and eliminated by the cell metabolism. It was determined to be the primary cause of death for 70% of supercentenarians who have been autopsied.

== Signs and symptoms ==
Wild-type transthyretin amyloid accumulates mainly in the heart, where it causes stiffness and often thickening of its walls, leading consequently to shortness of breath and intolerance to exercise, called diastolic dysfunction. Excessively slow heart rate can also occur, such as in sick sinus syndrome, with ensuing fatigue and dizziness. Wild-type transthyretin deposition is also a common cause of carpal tunnel syndrome in elderly men, which may cause pain, tingling and loss of sensation in the hands. Some patients may develop carpal tunnel syndrome as an initial symptom of wild-type transthyretin amyloid. There appears to be an increased risk of developing hematuria or blood in the urine due to urological lesions.

== Natural course ==
The disorder typically affects the heart and its prevalence increases in older age groups. Men are affected much more frequently than women, and up to 25% of men over the age of 80 may have evidence of WTTA.

Patients often present with increased thickness of the wall of the main heart chamber, the left ventricle. People affected by WTT amyloidosis are likely to have required a pacemaker before diagnosis and have a high incidence of a partial electrical blockage of the heart, known as the left bundle branch block. Low ECG signals such as QRS complexes are widely considered a marker of cardiac amyloidosis.

A much better survival has been reported for patients with WTTA as opposed to cardiac AL amyloidosis.

== Diagnosis ==
The condition is suspected in an elderly person, especially male, presenting with symptoms of heart failure such as shortness of breath or swollen legs, and or disease of the electrical system of the heart with ensuing slow heart rate, dizziness or fainting spells. The diagnosis is confirmed on the basis of a biopsy, which can be treated with a special stain called Congo Red that will be positive in this condition, and immunohistochemistry. However, this disease can now non-invasively be diagnosed with the help of Tc-99m pyrophosphate scintigraphy.

== Treatment ==
Treatment has historically focused on symptom management, although more recent evidence has supported tafamidis as a treatment associated with improved outcomes in transthyretin amyloid cardiomyopathy.

Wild-type transthyretin amyloid mainly affects the heart and is often referred to as transthyretin amyloid cardiomyopathy, which is typically seen in older adults over the age of 60. Evidence for tafamidis came from a phase 3 randomized, double-blind trial called the Transthyretin Amyloidosis Cardiomyopathy Clinical Trial, also known as ATTR-ACT, which involved 441 patients with transthyretin amyloid cardiomyopathy and investigated the effects of tafamidis. The trial found that tafamidis was associated with lower all-cause mortality than the placebo, with death occurring in 29.5% of patients receiving tafamidis compared with 42.9% of patients receiving placebo. Furthermore, other treatments that are still being evaluated for their long-term clinical role include gene-silencing therapies, such as RNA interference agents and antisense oligonucleotides, which have shown early evidence of reducing transthyretin production by targeting transthyretin messenger RNA in hepatocytes. A 2021 investigational first-in-human study demonstrated that NTLA-2001, a therapeutic agent based on the CRISPR-Cas9 system, induces targeted knockout of the transthyretin protein.

Permanent pacing can be employed in cases of symptomatic slow heart rate (bradycardia). Heart failure medications can be used to treat symptoms of difficulty breathing and congestion.

Delayed recognition of wild-type transthyretin amyloid may limit timely access to treatment, particularly because symptoms can overlap with other common cardiac conditions. Broader patient-safety literature has also emphasized that patient-related factors, gaps in understanding, and medication-related communication issues can affect treatment outcomes.

=== Orphan drug status for transthyretin (TTR) amyloidosis ===
Because of preliminary data suggesting the drug may have activity, the U.S. FDA in 2013 granted tolcapone "orphan drug status" in studies aiming at the treatment of transthyretin familial amyloidosis (ATTR). However, as of 2015 tolcapone was not FDA approved for the treatment of this disease.
