= Transthyretin =

Serum protein related to amyloid diseases

TTR
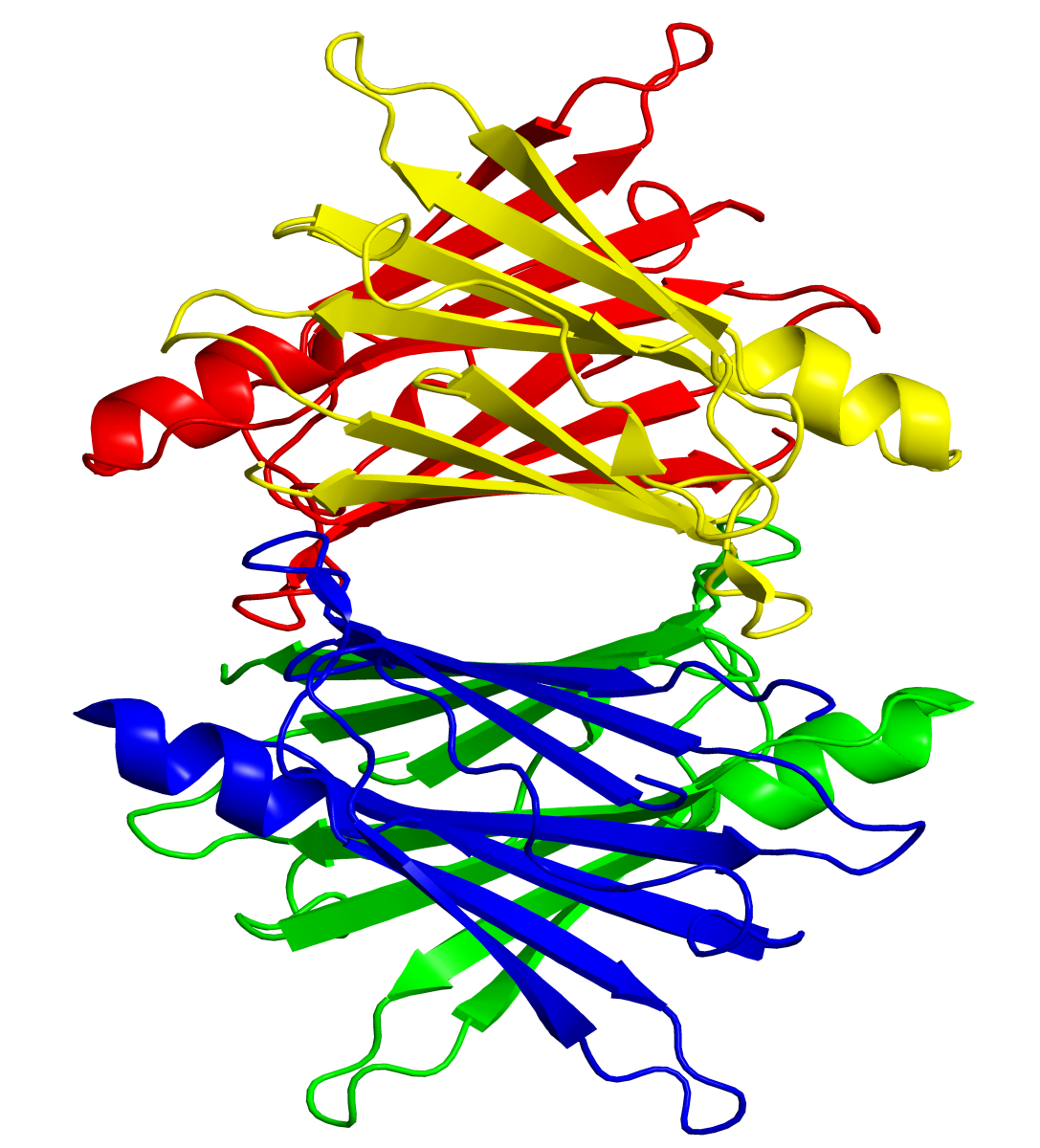

Identifiers
- Aliases: TTR, CTS, CTS1, HEL111, HsT2651, PALB, TBPA, transthyretin, ATTN
- External IDs: OMIM: 176300; MGI: 98865; GeneCards: TTR
Available structures
PDB	Ortholog search: PDBe RCSB
PDB	List of PDB id codes 1BM7, 1BMZ, 1BZ8, 1BZD, 1BZE, 1DVQ, 1DVS, 1DVT, 1DVU, 1DVX, 1DVY, 1DVZ, 1E3F, 1E4H, 1E5A, 1ETA, 1ETB, 1F41, 1F86, 1FH2, 1FHN, 1G1O, 1GKO, 1ICT, 1III, 1IIK, 1IJN, 1QAB, 1QWH, 1RLB, 1SOK, 1SOQ, 1THA, 1THC, 1TLM, 1TSH, 1TT6, 1TTA, 1TTB, 1TTC, 1TTR, 1TYR, 1TZ8, 1U21, 1X7S, 1X7T, 1Y1D, 1Z7J, 1ZCR, 1ZD6, 2B14, 2B15, 2B16, 2B77, 2B9A, 2F7I, 2F8I, 2FBR, 2FLM, 2G3X, 2G3Z, 2G4E, 2G4G, 2G5U, 2G9K, 2GAB, 2H4E, 2M5N, 2NOY, 2PAB, 2QEL, 2QGB, 2QGC, 2QGD, 2QGE, 2ROX, 2ROY, 2TRH, 2TRY, 2WQA, 3A4D, 3A4E, 3A4F, 3B56, 3BSZ, 3BT0, 3CBR, 3CFM, 3CFN, 3CFQ, 3CFT, 3CN0, 3CN1, 3CN2, 3CN3, 3CN4, 3CXF, 3D7P, 3DGD, 3DID, 3DJR, 3DJS, 3DJT, 3DJZ, 3DK0, 3DK2, 3DO4, 3ESN, 3ESO, 3ESP, 3FC8, 3FCB, 3GLZ, 3GPS, 3GRB, 3GRG, 3GS0, 3GS4, 3GS7, 3HJ0, 3I9A, 3I9I, 3IPB, 3IPE, 3KGS, 3KGT, 3KGU, 3M1O, 3NEO, 3NES, 3NEX, 3NG5, 3OZK, 3OZL, 3SSG, 3TCT, 3TFB, 3U2I, 3U2J, 3W3B, 4ABQ, 4ABU, 4ABV, 4ABW, 4AC2, 4AC4, 4ACT, 4ANK, 4DER, 4DES, 4DET, 4DEU, 4DEW, 4FI6, 4FI7, 4FI8, 4HIQ, 4HIS, 4IIZ, 4IK6, 4IK7, 4IKI, 4IKJ, 4IKK, 4IKL, 5TTR, 3D2T, 3I9P, 3IMR, 3IMS, 3IMT, 3IMU, 3IMV, 3IMW, 3NEE, 3P3R, 3P3S, 3P3T, 3P3U, 4HJS, 4HJT, 4HJU, 4I85, 4I87, 4I89, 4KY2, 4L1S, 4L1T, 4MAS, 4MRB, 4MRC, 4N85, 4N86, 4N87, 4PM1, 4PME, 4PMF, 4PVL, 4PVM, 4PVN, 4PWE, 4PWF, 4PWG, 4PWH, 4PWI, 4PWJ, 4PWK, 4QRF, 4QXV, 4QYA, 4TQ8, 4TQH, 4TQI, 4TQP, 4WNJ, 4WNS, 4WO0, 4YDM, 4YDN, 5BOJ, 4Y9B, 4Y9C, 4Y9E, 4Y9F, 4Y9G, 4TKW, 4TL4, 4TL5, 4TLK, 4TLS, 4TLT, 4TM9, 4TNE, 5AKS, 5AKT, 5AKV, 5AL0, 5AL8, 5CR1, 4TNF, 4TLU, 5AYT, 4TNG, 5EZP, 4D7B, 5A6I, 5E23, 5CNH, 5E4O, 5CN3, 5EN3, 5DWP, 5K1J, 5E4A, 5HJG, 5IHH

Gene location (Human)
Chr.	Chromosome 18 (human)
Band	18q12.1	Start	31,557,009 bp
Band	18q12.1	End	31,598,833 bp

Gene location (Mouse)
Chr.	Chromosome 18 (mouse)
Band	18 A2|18 11.47 cM	Start	20,798,337 bp
Band	18 A2|18 11.47 cM	End	20,807,378 bp
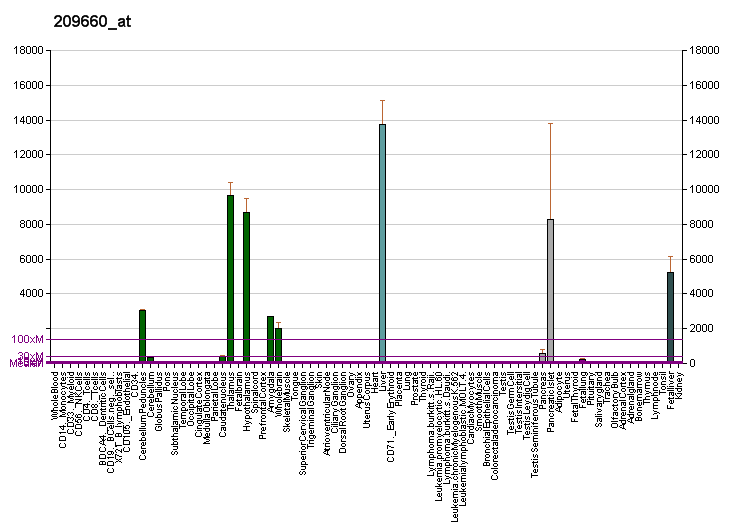
RNA expression pattern
Bgee	Human / Mouse (ortholog); Top expressed in: Epithelium of choroid plexus; beta cell; right lobe of liver; retinal pigment epithelium; body of pancreas; gallbladder; corpus callosum; gonad; C1 segment; hypothalamus / Top expressed in: Epithelium of choroid plexus; habenula; left lobe of liver; ciliary body; retinal pigment epithelium; choroid plexus of fourth ventricle; human fetus; vestibular membrane of cochlear duct; sexually immature organism; vestibular sensory epithelium; More reference expression data
BioGPS	More reference expression data
Gene ontology
Molecular function	identical protein binding; hormone binding; protein binding; hormone activity; protein heterodimerization activity; thyroid hormone binding
Cellular component	cytoplasm; extracellular region; extracellular exosome; extracellular space; azurophil granule lumen; protein-containing complex
Biological process	retinol metabolic process; extracellular matrix organization; retinoid metabolic process; purine nucleobase metabolic process; neutrophil degranulation; thyroid hormone transport; transport; regulation of signaling receptor activity; signal transduction
Sources:Amigo / QuickGO
Orthologs
Databases	NCBI: entry; OMA: entry
Species	Human	Mouse
Entrez	7276	22139
Ensembl	ENSG00000118271	ENSMUSG00000061808
UniProt	P02766	P07309
RefSeq (mRNA)	NM_000371	NM_013697
RefSeq (protein)	NP_000362	NP_038725
Location (UCSC)	Chr 18: 31.56 – 31.6 Mb	Chr 18: 20.8 – 20.81 Mb
PubMed search
- Wikidata
View/Edit Human	View/Edit Mouse

Transthyretin (TTR or TBPA) is a transport protein in the plasma and cerebrospinal fluid that transports the thyroid hormone thyroxine (T_{4}) and retinol to the liver. This is how transthyretin gained its name: transports thyroxine and retinol. The liver secretes TTR into the blood, and the choroid plexus secretes TTR into the cerebrospinal fluid.

TTR was originally called prealbumin (or thyroxine-binding prealbumin) because it migrated faster than albumin on electrophoresis gels. However, prealbumin was felt to be a misleading name, as it was not a synthetic precursor of albumin. The alternative name TTR was proposed by DeWitt Goodman in 1981.

Human transthyretrin protein is encoded by the TTR gene, which is located on the long arm of chromosome 18, in cytogenetic band 18q12.1.

== Binding affinities ==
It functions in concert with two other thyroid hormone-binding proteins in the serum:

Protein	Binding strength	Plasma concentration
thyroxine-binding globulin (TBG)	highest	lowest
transthyretin (TTR or TBPA)	lower	higher
albumin	poorest	much higher

In cerebrospinal fluid, TTR is the primary carrier of T_{4}. TTR also acts as a carrier of retinol (vitamin A) through its association with retinol-binding protein (RBP) in the blood and the CSF. Less than 1% of TTR's T_{4} binding sites are occupied in blood, which is taken advantage of below to prevent TTRs dissociation, misfolding and aggregation which leads to the degeneration of post-mitotic tissue.

Numerous other small molecules are known to bind in the thyroxine binding sites, including many natural products (such as resveratrol), drugs (tafamidis, diflunisal, and flufenamic acid), and toxicants (PCB). Transthyretin has also been shown to interact with perlecan.

== Structure ==
TTR is a 55 kDa homotetramer with a dimer of dimers quaternary structure that is synthesized in the liver, choroid plexus and retinal pigment epithelium for secretion into the bloodstream, cerebrospinal fluid and the eye, respectively. Each monomer is a 127-residue polypeptide rich in beta sheet structure. Association of two monomers via their edge beta-strands forms an extended beta sandwich. Further association of two of these dimers in a face-to-face fashion produces the homotetrameric structure and creates the two thyroxine binding sites per tetramer. This dimer-dimer interface, comprising the two T_{4} binding sites, is the weaker dimer-dimer interface and is the one that comes apart first in the process of tetramer dissociation.

== Role in disease ==
TTR misfolding and aggregation is known to be associated with amyloid diseases including wild-type transthyretin amyloidosis, familial amyloid polyneuropathy (FAP), and familial amyloid cardiomyopathy (FAC).

TTR tetramer dissociation is known to be rate-limiting for amyloid fibril formation. However, the monomer also must partially denature in order for TTR to be mis-assembly competent, leading to a variety of aggregate structures, including amyloid fibrils.

At least 114 disease-causing mutations in this gene have been discovered. While wild type TTR can dissociate, misfold, and aggregate, leading to SSA (senile systemic amyloidosis), point mutations within TTR are known to destabilize the tetramer composed of mutant and wild-type TTR subunits, facilitating more facile dissociation and/or misfolding and amyloidogenesis. A replacement of valine by methionine at position 30 (TTR V30M) is the mutation most commonly associated with FAP. A position 122 replacement of valine by isoleucine (TTR V122I) is carried by 3.9% of the African-American population, and is the most common cause of FAC. SSA is estimated to affect over 25% of the population over age 80. Severity of disease varies greatly by mutation, with some mutations causing disease in the first or second decade of life, and others being more benign. Deposition of TTR amyloid is generally observed extracellularly, although TTR deposits are also clearly observed within the cardiomyocytes of the heart.

Treatment of familial (hereditary) TTR amyloid disease has historically relied on liver transplantation as a crude form of gene therapy. Because TTR is primarily produced in the liver, replacement of a liver containing a mutant TTR gene with a normal gene is able to reduce the mutant TTR levels in the body to < 5% of pretransplant levels. Certain mutations, however, cause CNS amyloidosis, and due to their production by the choroid plexus, the CNS TTR amyloid diseases do not respond to gene therapy mediated by liver transplantation.

In 2011, the European Medicines Agency approved tafamidis (Vyndaqel) for the amelioration of FAP. Tafamidis kinetically stabilizes the TTR tetramer, preventing tetramer dissociation required for TTR amyloidogenesis and degradation of the autonomic nervous system and/or the peripheral nervous system and/or the heart.

TTR is also thought to have beneficial side effects, by binding to the infamous beta-amyloid protein, thereby preventing beta-amyloid's natural tendency to accumulate into the plaques associated with the early stages of Alzheimer's disease. Preventing plaque formation is thought to enable a cell to rid itself of this otherwise toxic protein form and, thus, help prevent and maybe even treat the disease.

There is now strong genetic and pharmacologic data (see European Medicines Agency website for the tafamidis clinical trial results) indicating that the process of amyloid fibril formation leads to the degeneration of post-mitotic tissue causing FAP and likely FAC and SSA. Evidence points to the oligomers generated in the process of amyloidogenicity leading to the observed proteotoxicity.

Transthyretin level in cerebrospinal fluid has also been found to be lower in patients with some neurobiological disorders such as schizophrenia. The reduced level of transthyretin in the CSF may indicate a lower thyroxine transport in brains of patients with schizophrenia.

Transthyretin is known to contain a Gla domain, and thus be dependent for production on post-translational modification requiring vitamin K, but the potential link between vitamin k status and thyroid function has not been explored.

Because transthyretin is made in part by the choroid plexus, it can be used as an immunohistochemical marker for choroid plexus papillomas as well as carcinomas.

As of March 2015, there are two ongoing clinical trials undergoing recruitment in the United States and worldwide to evaluate potential treatments for TTR amyloidosis.
