= Serum free light-chain measurement =

Aspect of medicine

- Purpose: Measurement of the serum level of FLCs

Free light chains (FLCs) are immunoglobulin light chains that are found in the serum (blood) in an unbound (free) state. In recent decades, measuring the amount of free light chains (FLCs) in the blood has become a practical clinical test. FLC tests can be used to diagnose and monitor diseases like multiple myeloma and amyloidosis.

== Structure ==
Each immunoglobulin light-chain molecule contains approximately 220 amino acids in a single polypeptide chain that is folded to form constant and variable region domains. Each domain comprises two β-pleated sheets. The sheets are linked by a disulfide bridge and together form a roughly barrel-shaped structure known as a β-barrel. The variable (V) domain of light chains has a high degree of structural diversity, particularly the antigen-binding region. In addition, the first 23 amino acids of the 1st variable domain framework region have a number of variations known as subgroups. Four kappa (Vκ1–Vκ4) and six lambda subgroups (Vλ1–Vλ6) can be identified. The subgroup structures of FLCs influence their ability to polymerize (combine) and form proteins like amyloid fibrils. For example, the Vλ6 subgroup of FLCs is associated with a type of amyloidosis called AL amyloidosis, while the Vκ1 and Vκ4 subgroups are associated with a different type of amyloidosis called light-chain deposition disease.

== Synthesis ==
Kappa light-chain molecules are constructed from approximately 40 functional Vκ gene segments (chromosome 2), five Jκ gene segments and a single Cκ gene. Lambda molecules (chromosome 22) are constructed from about 30 Vλ gene segments and four pairs of functional Jλ gene segments and a Cλ gene.

Light chains are incorporated into immunoglobulin molecules during B-cell development and are expressed initially on the surface of pre B-cells. Production of light chains occurs throughout the rest of B-cell development and in plasma cells, where secretion is highest.

== Production ==
The production of free immunoglobulin light chains in normal individuals is approximately 500 mg/day from bone marrow and lymph node cells. The production of immunoglobulin light chains is about 40% greater than the production of immunoglobulin heavy chains. This may simply be to allow for the proper structure of the intact immunoglobulin molecules, but it is also possible that free light chains have an immunological function. There are approximately twice as many kappa-producing plasma cells as lambda plasma cells. Kappa free-light chains are normally monomeric, while lambda free-light chains tend to be dimeric, joined by disulphide bonds. Polymeric forms of both types of free light chain can also occur.

== Metabolism ==
In normal individuals, free light chains are rapidly cleared from the blood and catabolised by the kidneys. Monomeric free light chains are cleared in 2–4 hours, and dimeric light chains in 3–6 hours. Removal may be prolonged to 2–3 days in people with complete renal failure. Human kidneys are composed of approximately half a million nephrons. Each nephron contains a glomerulus with basement membrane pores that allow filtration of immunoglobulin light chains and other small molecules from the blood into the proximal tubule of the nephron.

Filtered molecules are either excreted in the urine or may be specifically re-absorbed. Protein molecules that pass through the glomerular pores are either absorbed unchanged (such as albumin), degraded in the proximal tubular cells and absorbed (such as free light chains), or excreted as fragments. This re-absorption is mediated by a receptor complex (megalin/cubulin) and prevents the loss of large amounts of protein into the urine. It is very efficient and can process 10–30 g of low-molecular-weight proteins per day, so under normal conditions no light chains pass beyond the proximal tubules.

If immunoglobulin light chains are produced in sufficient amounts to overwhelm the proximal tubules' absorption mechanisms (usually due to the presence of a plasma cell tumour) the light chains enter the distal tubules and can appear in the urine (Bence Jones protein). The passage of large amounts of immunoglobulin light chains through the kidneys may cause inflammation or blockage of the kidney tubules.

The distal tubules of the kidneys secrete large amounts of uromucoid (Tamm–Horsfall protein). This is the dominant protein in normal urine and is thought to be important in preventing ascending urinary infections. It is a relatively small glycoprotein (80 kDa) that aggregates into polymers of 20–30 molecules. It contains a short amino-acid sequence that can specifically bind to some free light chains. Together they can form an insoluble precipitate which blocks the distal part of the nephrons. This is termed "cast nephropathy" or "myeloma kidney" and is typically found in patients with multiple myeloma. This can block the flow of urine causing the death of the respective nephrons. Rising concentrations of light chains are filtered by the remaining nephrons leading to a cycle of accelerating renal damage with rising concentrations of free light chains in the blood. At the same time, the amount of free light chains entering the urine will be decreased and will be zero if the patient stops producing urine (anuria). Conversely, urine concentrations of free light chains could increase if renal function improved in a multiple myeloma patient receiving treatment. This could account for the poor correlation frequently seen when urine and serum free light-chain concentrations are compared.

The 500 mg of FLCs produced per day by the normal lymphoid system, however, flows through the glomeruli and is completely processed by the proximal tubules. If the proximal tubules of the nephrons are damaged or stressed (such as in hard exercise), filtered FLCs may not be completely metabolised and small amounts may then appear in the urine.

== Clinical use ==
Serum free light-chain assays have been used in a number of published studies which have indicated superiority over the urine tests, particularly for patients producing low levels of monoclonal free light chains, as seen in nonsecretory multiple myeloma and AL amyloidosis. This is primarily because of the re-absorption of free light chains in the kidneys, creating a threshold of light chain production which must be exceeded before measurable quantities overflow into the urine. While there are a number of publications indicating that serum free light chain analysis is preferable to urine analysis at diagnosis, there is currently no consensus on whether urine tests for monitoring should be replaced.

A series of studies, principally from the Mayo Clinic, have indicated that patients with an abnormal free kappa to free lambda ratio have an increased risk of progression to active myeloma from precursor conditions including monoclonal gammopathy of undetermined significance (MGUS), smouldering myeloma and solitary plasmacytoma of the bone. Abnormal free light chain production has also been reported to be prognostic of a worse outcome in multiple myeloma and chronic lymphocytic leukaemia. An abnormal light-chain ratio has been defined as a kappa to lambda chain ratio of less than 0.26 or more than 1.65.

== Guidelines ==
In 2009, the International Myeloma Working Group published guidelines making recommendations of when serum free light-chain analysis should be used in the management of multiple myeloma.

=== Diagnosis ===
The serum free light-chain assay in combination with serum protein electrophoresis and serum immunofixation electrophoresis is sufficient to screen for pathological monoclonal plasmaproliferative disorders other than AL amyloidosis which requires all the serum tests as well as 24 h urine immunofixation electrophoresis.

=== Monitoring ===
Serial serum free light-chain measurement should be routinely performed in patients with AL amyloidosis and multiple myeloma patients with oligosecretory disease. It should also be done in all patients who have achieved a complete response to treatment to determine whether they have attained a stringent complete response.

Other guidelines for the use of serum free light chain measurement in the management of AL amyloidosis, plasmacytoma and the comparison of treatment responses in clinical trials have also been published.

Technical and clinical reviews of serum free light-chain measurement have recently been written by Pratt and Jagannath.
