= Monoclonal immunoglobulin deposition disease =

- Other names: MIDD
- Diagnostic method: Serum protein electrophoresis, Urine protein electrophoresis
- Treatment: Bortezomib-based management, Organ transplant

Monoclonal immunoglobulin deposition disease, or MIDD, is a disease characterised by the deposition of monoclonal immunoglobulins on the basement membrane of the kidney. Monoclonal immunoglobulins are produced by monoclonal plasma cells, which are found in a variety of plasma cell dyscrasias. The deposition of monoclonal immunoglobulins on the basement membrane of the kidney causes renal impairment. As well as the kidney, MIDD may also affect the liver, heart, peripheral nerves, lung and skin.

== Symptoms and signs ==
When presenting to primary care physicians, patients with MIDD frequently have renal insufficiency, proteinuria and these symptoms are often accompanied by nephrotic syndrome, but patients may also present with acute renal failure. 83% of MIDD patients have renal insufficiency, and while almost all patients will have proteinuria, 40-50% will have proteinuria in the nephrotic range. Some patients may also have haematuria and hypertension but this is not found in all patients.

== Pathogenesis ==
The underlying cause of MIDD is the production of monoclonal immunoglobulins. Monoclonal immunoglobulins are produced in diseases that feature abnormal proliferation of plasma cells. These diseases include monoclonal gammopathy of undetermined significance, smoldering multiple myeloma, multiple myeloma and Waldenström's macroglobulinemia. Almost 29% of monoclonal gammopathy patients may have MIDD. In MIDD, these abnormal immunoglobulins, or fragments of them, are deposited along the basement membrane of the kidney. This deposition damages the kidney, leading to renal insufficiency. The damage to the kidney may also prevent protein re-absorption by the kidney; instead of being reabsorbed, the proteins enter the urine. It can also lead to the other symptoms of nephrotic syndrome such as swelling and low serum albumin. Because of the effect MIDD has on the kidneys, it is classified as a monoclonal gammopathy of renal significance. As the deposits have no organised structure, it is grouped among the non-organised monoclonal gammopathies of renal significance.

== Diagnosis ==
Techniques commonly used to aid the diagnosis of MIDD include serum protein electrophoresis, urine protein electrophroresis, serum or urine immunofixation, measurement of serum free light chains and renal biopsy. Immunofluorescence is then used on the biopsied sample to detect the protein deposits on the basement membrane. Increasingly, mass spectroscopy of the protein deposits may be used alongside or instead of immunohistochemical staining. This may be particularly useful in MIDD patients who have an amyloid fibril disorder as well as MIDD, as MIDD deposits do not exhibit Congo Red staining while amyloid fibrils do. If both types of disease co-exist, the staining may be confused, while mass spectrometry results will be more clear. Electron microscopy may also be used.

=== Subtypes ===
There are three subtypes of MIDD, light chain deposition disease where Immunoglobulin light chains are deposited on the basement membrane, light and heavy chain deposition disease, where both heavy and light chains of immunoglobulins are deposited, and heavy chain deposition disease, where only immunoglobulin heavy chains are deposited. Light chain deposition disease (LCDD) is the most common of the three subtypes (around 80% of all MIDD), but it and MIDD as a whole are classified as a rare disorder. All three subtypes feature disordered deposits which do not have any fixed structure. The diseases vary in what part of the immunoglobulin is deposited, and which measurement techniques are most useful in aiding their diagnosis. Light microscopy cannot distinguish between the three subtypes, but immunofluorescence can. The symptoms of the three subtypes are similar, but Heavy Chain Deposition Disease (HCDD) patient may have greater proteinuria than patients with the other subtypes. The prognosis of MIDD is variable.

==== Light Chain Deposition Disease ====
Light Chain Deposition Disease (LCDD) features deposition of light chains only. This is most commonly associated with κ free light chains. Serum protein electrophoresis or immunofixation is positive in 25-76% of cases, while urine protein electrophoresis or immunofixation is positive in 42-90% of cases. Serum free light chain measurement is positive in 100% of cases. LCDD is associated with multiple myeloma in 39-59% of cases, with monoclonal gammopathy of renal significance in 39% of cases and may also be associated with lymphoplasmacytic lymphoma. The median 5-year overall survival of LCDD patients is 70%.

==== Light and Heavy Chain Deposition Disease ====
Light and Heavy Chain Deposition Disease (LHCDD or HLCDD in the scientific literature) features deposition of both light chains and heavy chains. Most commonly, this subtype is formed from IgGk monoclonal immunoglobulins. Serum or urine protein electrophoresis or immunofixation is positive in 80-100% of cases, while serum free light chain measurement is positive in 100% of cases. LHCDD is associated with multiple myeloma in 50% of cases. Deposition of complement protein C3 (and sometimes C1q) may also be seen in LHCDD.

==== Heavy Chain Deposition Disease ====
Heavy Chain Deposition Disease (HCDD) features deposition of heavy chains only. Most commonly, this subtype is formed of monoclonal proteins of the IgG1 subclass of IgG. The immunoglobulin heavy chain in HCDD is frequently a truncated heavy chain. HCDD is the rarest subtype of MIDD. Serum protein electrophoresis or immunofixation is positive in 67-100% of cases, while urine protein electrophoresis or immunofixation is positive in 50-100% of cases. Serum free light chain measurement is positive in 100% of cases, evidence that the underlying monoclonal plasma cells secrete free light chains as well as heavy chains. HCDD is associated with multiple myeloma in 29% of cases. Deposition of complement protein C3 (and sometimes Cq1) may also be seen in HCDD.

== Treatment ==
Bortezomib

Early treatment is recommended in MIDD to prevent or reduce irreversible kidney damage. Treatment is directed at the underlying monoclonal gammopathy, and is intended to reduce the production of the monoclonal proteins and may include bortezomib-based treatment, an autologous stem cell transplant, and if the patient is considered eligible, an organ transplant. Bortezomib is frequently used as it is less harmful to the kidneys which may already have been damaged by the disease. Disease reoccurrence after organ transplant is common.

== Epidemiology ==
The median age of patients with MIDD is between 56 and 64 years old, and men make up two thirds of MIDD patients. Around 50% of patients with MIDD have multiple myeloma.

MIDD is a rare disease, with incidence estimated at 1 person per million per year in Western countries.

== History ==
MIDD was first described in the medical literature by Kobernick et al. in 1957. They described it as "a non-amyloid kidney disease resembling diabetic glomerulosclerosis in non-diabetic myeloma patients." LCDD was further described by Randall et al. in 1976 which is why it is sometimes referred to as Randall-type MIDD. Preud'homme et al. described LHCDD in 1980. Tubbs et al. described HCDD in 1992, which was grouped under the name of MIDD, first suggested by Buxbaum et al. in 1990.
