= Heredofamilial amyloidosis =

- Other names: Hereditary amyloidosis, familial amyloidosis
- Specialty: Dermatology

Heredofamilial amyloidosis, also known as hereditary amyloidosis, or familial amyloidosis, is an inherited condition that may be characterized by systemic or localized deposition of amyloid in body tissues.

== See also ==
- Amyloidosis
- List of cutaneous conditions
