= Endocapillary proliferative glomerulonephritis =

Renal glomerulus

Endocapillary proliferative glomerulonephritis is a histological pattern with the basis of glomerular inflammation. It is characterized by endothelial hypercellularity (lining capillary loops) and white blood cell infiltrates resulting from subendothelial immune deposits. Both cells' distribution and expansion are restricted to the capillary lumen, within the glomerular basement membrane. Hence the histological pattern of endocapillary proliferative glomerulonephritis is marked by the presence of endomembranous deposits in the subendothelial space confined to the glomerular capillary filtration barrier.

== Pathophysiology ==
Different etiologies of proliferative GN share a commonality in almost all forms, the key pathological driver being the accumulation of immune deposits including antigen-antibody complexes, complement, and Ig within the subendothelial space between the endothelium and glomerular basement membrane. This inciting trigger activates not only local inflammation, but also stimulates the complement system, resulting in an influx of inflammatory cells, including neutrophils and monocytes, alongside cell proliferation of endogenous endothelial cells. This intense hypercellularity and dense deposits cause capillary lumen occlusion and capillary wall thickening which compromises the filtration barrier, resulting in the leakage of proteins and RBCs in the urine (hematuria and proteinuria) alongside edema. These functional changes are congruent/correspondent to nephritic syndrome.

=== Immune antigen-antibody complexes ===
==== PIGN ====
- Post-streptococcal: PSGN: group A beta-hemolytic streptococcal infection results in the release of soluble cationic streptococcal antigens with high affinity for the negatively-charged GBM. These antigens form complexes either in-situ or in the peripheral blood. Once deposited the complexes cause type III HS activating the alternative complement pathway (reduces C3, normal C4) inducing leukocyte proliferation alongside endothelial and mesangial hypercellularity compromising glomerular filtration.
  - Streptococcal antigens = M protein, nephritis-associated plasmin receptor, and streptococcal pyrogenic exotoxin B
- Post-staphylococcal: staphylococcal infections during active bacteremia produce super antigens that bind to MHC-II on antigen presenting cells, activating T-cells triggering dysregulated proliferation of T cells and B cells leading to a systemic cytokine storm. To manage bacteremia neutrophils create NETs that get trapped in glomerular capillaries causing endothelial damage.
  - Staphylococcal super antigens = staphylococcal enterotoxins C, A, and toxic shock syndrome toxin-1
- Others: viral and parasitic (rare)

==== IgA nephropathy ====
Faulty immunoglobulin causes dysregulated immune response triggered by previous infection, genetic (galactose-deficient IgA1), or idiopathic causes. Abnormal IgA are recognized as foreign, resulting in the production of anti-glycan autoantibodies. IgA complexes are circulating or formed in situ primarily in the mesangium. Deposits lead to lectin and alternative pathway complement activation causing an influx of macrophage and dendritic cells resulting in GBM damage and interstitial fibrosis.

==== Lupus nephritis ====
Impaired apoptotic clearance of dead cells results in autoimmunity - nucleosome (DNA debris) lingers extracellularly causing anti-dsDNA autoantibodies [lupus autoimmunity] complexes may form in peripheral blood or deposit in-situ, initially confined to the mesangium.

Epitope spreading occurs with increase of complex burden, proportionally target proteins increase, expanding deposition to the subendothelium. Proliferation drives type III HS and triggers the classical complement cascade (low C3 and low C4) leading to leukocyte infiltration and kidney damage.

- Class I/II = mesangial
- Class III/IV = sub endothelial space

=== Complement cascade ===
Pathogenesis of EPGN is fundamentally driven by the activation of the complement cascade. In autoimmune etiologies the classical pathway typically plays the major role, whereas other EPGN forms demonstrate a marked activation of the alternative pathway. This differential triggering translates to a distinct consumption pattern evident in the serum profile, resulting in significant C3 depletion (hypocomplementemia) while C4 levels remain relatively preserved.

The consequent generation of potent chemotactic factors (C3a and C5a) provides the stimulus for a massive influx of inflammatory infiltrates. Polymorphonuclear leukocytes and monocytes are recruited directly to the glomerular capillaries, further driving the endocapillary hypercellularity and exacerbating the local glomerular inflammation.

=== Monoclonal immunoglobulin deposit ===
Proliferative glomerulonephritis with monoclonal immunoglobulin deposits is a monoclonal gammopathy distinguished by a glomerular deposition of immunoglobulin causing kidney injury. It is a rare type of monoclonal gammopathy of renal significance. The glomerular injury occurs via a direct deposition mechanism of monoclonal immunoglobulin and leads to proliferative glomerulonephritis. The predominant immunoglobulin found in PGNMID is IgG3. It is limited by the glomerular filtration membrane due to its high molecular weight, which makes it prone to deposit on the glomerular capillary wall. The physiopathological mechanism giving rise to glomerular monoclonal immunoglobulin deposit is scarcely described and remains unclear. The deposition of IgG3 initiates the classical complement pathway as it has the ability to self-aggregate through Fc-Fc fragments and a high affinity at binding C1q.

== Histopathology ==
Patterns found using histological approaches play a critical role in revealing and managing glomerular pathologies. Histology not only aids in diagnosis, revealing underlying etiology, but also determines management through proper therapeutic and prognostic prediction.

Histology is facilitated by obtaining a sample through a renal biopsy, after thoroughly eliminating contraindications and establishing the correct indications. The specimen is evaluated using three standard techniques, including light microscopy, immunofluorescence, and electron microscopy. Light microscopy and immunofluorescence reveal the nature and architecture of glomeruli, while electron microscopy displays an all-around ultrastructural view of all sub-components.

In endocapillary proliferative glomerulonephritis, the main focus is on glomerular endothelial cells, which form the inner layer of the glomerular filtration membrane, and their elementary lesions, which may be diffuse or global. Upon sample observation, any noted endocapillary cellular proliferation translates histologically to an acute inflammatory state with moderate renal failure, as well as proof of circulating inflammatory cells. As discussed in the pathophysiology section, the typical picture of EPGN is the presence of cellular proliferation alongside characteristic endomembranous deposits (in the subendothelial space) specific to the underlying etiology.

=== Immune complexes ===
==== PIGN: strep. = IgG, C3 deposits ====
- Light microscopy:
  - Appearance: lobular clover-like (enlarged hypercellular glomeruli)
  - Pattern: diffuse endocapillary and mesangial hypercellularity and edema
  - Infiltration: neutrophil predominance over mononuclear cells
  - If severely progressive: glomerular fibrinoid necrosis, microthrombosis, and crescents
  - Preserved GBM thickness
- Immunofluorescence:
  - Staining patterns: starry-sky, garland-like
  - Granular deposit [IgG and C3]
    - Immunoglobulin: polyclonal IgG+++, and rare IgM, IgA
      - IgA predominance = staphylococcal infection
    - Complement: C3
      - (-) C1q and C4
      - ± properdin
- Electron microscopy:
  - Cell proliferation: endocapillary hypercellularity, neutrophilic Infiltration
  - Deposit:
    - Pattern: mesangial and subendothelial
    - Hallmark: large semi-lunar and hump-type subepithelial deposits & preserved GBM with no reaction

==== IgA nephropathy: IgA & C3 deposits ====
- Light microscopy:
  - Focal (minimal) or diffuse mesangial proliferation
    - Focal <50% of glomeruli
    - Diffuse >50% of glomeruli
  - Pattern: endocapillary and extracapillary proliferative lesions with subendothelial deposits
  - Expanded ECM and obstructed capillary lumen
  - If advanced/progressive = segmental glomerulosclerosis, crescent, interstitial fibrosis, tubular atrophy
- Immunofluorescence:
  - Expanded mesangium with segmental lesions
  - Mesangial deposits - polyclonal with intense lambda(λ) chains over kappa(𝜅) [(co)dominant IgA + C3]
    - Immunoglobulin
      - Polymeric IgA (IgA1 subclass) -> nonspecific to IgA nephropathy
      - Others: IgG, IgM
    - Complement
      - (+): C3 (IgA co-deposit, proportional staining), C4d (lectin pathway)
        - C3 ≤ IgA
      - (-): C1q (classic complement pathway)
- Electron microscopy:
  - Cell proliferation: mesangial hypercellularity with excess matrix
  - Deposit: subepithelial and subendothelial(endocapillary) deposits of GBM

==== Lupus: IgM, IgG, C3 ====
Main classes corresponding to endocapillary proliferation and hypercellularity:

- Class III (focal)
  - Immunofluorescence:
    - <50% glomeruli affected
    - Deposits: mesangial, subendothelial, and/or subepithelial space
    - Cell proliferation: segmented or global hypercellularity
    - Patterns: endocapillary and extracapillary
- Class IV (diffuse)
  - Immunofluorescence:
    - >50% glomeruli affected
    - Deposits: mesangial, subendothelial, or subepithelial space
    - Pattern: segmental or global endocapillary hypercellularity

Remaining classes:

- Class I (minimal mesangial)
  - LM: normal glomeruli
  - IF: purely mesangial deposits
  - EM: podocyte foot process effacement
- Class II (proliferative mesangial)
  - IF: strict mesangial deposits in mesangial matrix with at least 4 nuclei surrounded by ECM, mesangial hypercellularity
- Class V (membranous)
  - IF: thickening of GBM
- Class VI:
  - IF: sclerosis of >90% of glomerular capillaries

=== Complement ===
Light microscopy: the exudative reaction, is the earliest histological effect of complement activation, especially from C5a generation, is the recruitment of leukocytes.

- Endocapillary hypercellularity: under LM, the glomeruli appear enlarged and crowded due to proliferation of endothelial and mesangial cells, along with a significant influx of neutrophils and monocytes.
- Capillary blockage: swelling of endothelial cells and accumulation of white blood cells occlude capillary lumens, giving the glomerular tuft a solid, lobulated look where the usual clear capillary spaces disappear.
- Fibrinoid necrosis: Severe, acute stages, intense complement activation can cause localized damage to the capillary wall, visible as smudgy, eosinophilic necrotic areas.

Immunofluorescence: visualizing the complement cascade IF shows complement proteins frozen in place.

- Starry sky (C3 deposits): key feature of EPGN, especially post-infectious, is coarse, granular C3 deposits along capillary walls and mesangium, representing the active complement pathways.
- C3 & Ig staining: often, C3 staining is much stronger than IgG, indicating ongoing complement activation, usually via the alternative pathway, even after antibodies start to clear.
  - Pathway signatures
    - Post-strep: C3 positive, C1q negative (alternative pathway).
    - Lupus: both C3 and C1q positive (classical pathway).

Electron microscopy: underlying damage EM shows ultrastructural injury caused by the membrane attack complex (MAC/C5b-9).

- Subepithelial humps: electron-dense deposits representing immune complexes and complement proteins on the outer surface of the basement membrane.
- Endothelial changes: the sub-lytic MAC impairs endothelial cells without destroying them, causing loss of fenestrations, swelling, and flattening, which blocks filtration and contributes to oliguria in patients.

=== Monoclonal immunoglobulin deposit ===
Proliferative glomerulonephritis with monoclonal immunoglobulin deposits is frequently characterised by diffuse endocapillary proliferative glomerulonephritis. However, the most predominant histological pattern is membranoproliferative glomerulonephritis.

Proceeding with the standard techniques of glomerular study, the diagnostic kidney biopsy most often reveals:

- Two types of lesions on light microscopy: proliferative or membranoproliferative lesions.
- The direct immunofluorescence demonstrates stained capillary and mesangial glomerular deposition of monotypic immunoglobulin class, immunoglobulin G, with one heavy chain subclass (most frequently IgG3) and a single light chain, either a λ or κ restriction. The most observed subtype is IgGκ. Complement deposits, C1 and/or C3 can also be found. The IgG deposits are restricted to the glomerular compartment.
- In proliferative glomerulonephritis with monoclonal immunoglobulin deposits, electron microscopy shows non-organised, amorphous and granular deposits. They are most commonly subendothelial and mesangial.

== Classification ==
In 2015, a shift was established by the Mayo Clinic Renal Pathology Society consensus in the classification of proliferative GN. Previous classifications of proliferative glomerulonephritis were based solely on injury patterns, distinguishing pathologies by tissue damage/insult. However, etiologies may present with polymorphic, distinct patterns of injury. With pattern non-specificity and no direct link to pathology, the classification was enhanced to a deposit-type etiology-based approach for clear cause identification. This classification links histological findings and pathophysiology, allowing for easy narrowing down of etiologies. The classification system is based on a deposit-type approach, with the main deposit type categories specific to the endocapillary pattern of injury, including immune (Ag/Ab - polyclonal Ig) complexes, complement, and monoclonal Ig.

Deposit-type classification of endocapillary proliferative glomerulonephritis

Deposit-type	Correspondent etiology
Immune complexes	Infection-related GN (PIGN)
Immune complexes	IgA nephropathy
Immune complexes	Lupus nephritis
Complement	C3 glomerulonephropathy
Monoclonal	Monoclonal Ig deposition
