= AL amyloidosis =

- Other names: Primary systemic amyloidosis (PSA), primary amyloidosis
- Specialty: Hematology
- Frequency: 0.005%

Amyloid light-chain (AL) amyloidosis, also known as primary amyloidosis, is the most common form of systemic amyloidosis. The disease is caused when a person's antibody-producing cells do not function properly and produce abnormal protein fibers made of components of antibodies called light chains. These light chains come together to form amyloid deposits which can cause serious damage to different organs. An abnormal light chain in urine is known as Bence Jones protein.

== Signs and symptoms ==
AL amyloidosis can affect a wide range of organs, and consequently present with a range of symptoms. Non-specific symptoms may include fatigue and weight loss. The kidneys are commonly affected in systemic AL amyloidosis with 60–70% of people having kidney involvement. Symptoms of kidney disease and kidney failure can include fluid retention, swelling, and shortness of breath. Other manifestations of kidney involvement may include protein loss in the urine, low albumin levels in the blood and secondary hyperlipidemia (nephrotic syndrome). Kidney damage in AL amyloidosis may progress to end stage disease requiring dialysis.

70–80% of those with AL amyloidosis have heart involvement, and heart involvement is the leading cause of death. Heart complications, include heart failure and irregular heart beat. Early heart involvement in AL amyloidosis may present as low voltage electrical rhythms on an electrocardiograph, concentric left ventricular hypertrophy and diastolic dysfunction. A person may progress to overt heart failure due to cardiomyopathy as amyloid fibril deposition in the heart muscle progresses. Further signs of cardiac involvement in AL amyloidosis include heart arrhythmias (bradycardia, ventricular tachycardia) which may necessitate pacemaker or implantable defibrillator placement and reduced contractility of the atria, with the associated risk of atrial blood clots.

AL amyloidosis may also cause nerve damage (neuropathy) which may present as pain, discomfort or loss of sensation in the extremities in instances of peripheral neuropathy or gastrointestinal motility disorders, difficulties regulating blood pressure with changes in position or neurogenic bladder in instances of dysfunction of the autonomic nervous system. Other organ systems that may be involved include gastrointestinal tract, blood, lungs and skin. Other symptoms can include stroke, gastrointestinal disorders, enlarged liver, diminished spleen function, diminished function of the adrenal and other endocrine glands, skin color change or growths, lung problems, or bleeding and bruising problems. An enlarged tongue, or macroglossia, is sometimes seen in AL amyloidosis.

== Causes ==
AL amyloidosis is caused by the deposition of abnormal antibody free light chains. The abnormal light chains are produced by monoclonal plasma cells, and, although AL amyloidosis can occur without diagnosis of another disorder, it is often associated with other plasma cell disorders, such as multiple myeloma and Waldenström's macroglobulinemia. About 10% to 15% of patients with multiple myeloma may develop overt AL amyloidosis. AL amyloidosis is not considered to be hereditary.

== Diagnosis ==
Diagnosis of AL amyloidosis requires identification of amyloid deposits within a tissue sample and confirmation of a plasma cell disorder. Both blood and urine can be tested for the light chains which form amyloid deposits, however the diagnosis requires a sample of an amyloid deposit. A fine needle aspiration (FNA) may be done of the abdominal fat pad (which commonly contains amyloid deposits) to aid in the diagnosis of AL amyloidosis. The abdominal fat pad is much more easily accessed for biopsy than the target organs affected by amyloid (such as the heart or kidneys) and confirmation of amyloid light chain deposits in the abdominal fat pad is used as a diagnostic surrogate of amyloid deposits in other organs when combined with imaging. FNA of the abdominal fat pad shows amyloid deposits in 70-75% of cases of suspected AL amyloidosis and diagnosed 85% of cases when combined with a bone marrow biopsy. Other peripheral areas such as the salivary glands, gingiva, rectum or skin may also be biopsied, however in some cases a biopsy of the target organ may be needed. On microscopic exam of biopsy specimens, amyloid deposits appear green ("apple-green birefringence") when stained with Congo Red dye and viewed under polarized light.

Disordered plasma cells with a monoclonal protein product (immunoglobulin light chains) are confirmed in AL amyloidosis using serum or urine protein electrophoresis, immunoglobulin free light-chain assays or identification of lambda or kappa restricted plasma cells on a bone marrow biopsy. The precursor protein that is forming the amyloid fibrils may be identified using immunohistochemical studies such as immunofluorescence or immunostaining, immunogold electron microscopy or mass spectroscopy (which is not widely available). Mass spectroscopy has a sensitivity of 88% and a specificity of 96% in identifying the precursor protein in AL amyloidosis.

Cardiac involvement in AL amyloidosis may be assessed using echocardiography, cardiac magnetic resonance (cardiac MRI) or positron emission tomography (PET scan).

== Treatment ==
The most effective treatment is autologous bone marrow transplants with stem cell rescues. However many patients are too weak to tolerate this approach.

Other treatments can involve application of chemotherapy similar to that used in multiple myeloma, which targets the plasma cells responsible for producing the misfolded light chain proteins. The most widely used regiment, and first line therapy, for those ineligible for a stem cell transplant is cyclophosphamide, bortezomib and dexamethasone (CyBorD) with daratumumab added. Daratumumab, a monoclonal antibody to CD38, a protein that is expressed on plasma cells, was approved in US and EU for AL Amyloidosis in 2021. CyBorD with daratumumab has a 78% very good partial hematologic response rate or better as well as a 55-55% organ response rate (reductions in organ damage) at 18 months, with the addition of daratumumab to CyBorD being associated with improved outcomes. CyBorD may be used alone, or bortezomib–melphalan–dexamethasone may be used in resource limited settings where daratumumab is not available.

Birtamimab and anselamimab are monoclonal antibodies which are currently undergoing trials. The two antibodies work by targeting the misfolded immunoglobulin light chains making up the amyloid fibrils and designating them for destruction by macrophages, thus degrading amyloid microfibril deposits.

Supportive care in AL amyloidosis consists of salt restriction and diuretics in those with heart failure or kidney involvement. An angiotensin converting enzyme inhibitor (ACEi) or angiotensin receptor blocker (ARB) may be used in those with significant proteinuria due to kidney disease. Amiodarone or an implantable defibrillator are sometimes needed for those with cardiomyopathy due to AL amyloidosis who are at risk of ventricular arrhythmias. Those with AL amyloidosis and kidney disease may require dialysis if kidney involvement progresses.

== Prognosis ==
Median survival for patients diagnosed with AL amyloidosis was 13 months in the early 1990s, but had improved to about 40 months a decade later with 5 year survival rates also increasing from 15% in the 1980s to 48% in the mid 2010s . Heart involvement is associated with a worse prognosis.

== Epidemiology ==
AL amyloidosis is a rare disease; only 1200 to 3200 new cases are reported each year in the United States, and between 500 and 600 in the UK. Two thirds of patients with AL amyloidosis are male and less than 5% of patients are under 40 years of age.

== See also ==
- Light chain deposition disease
