= SAP scan =

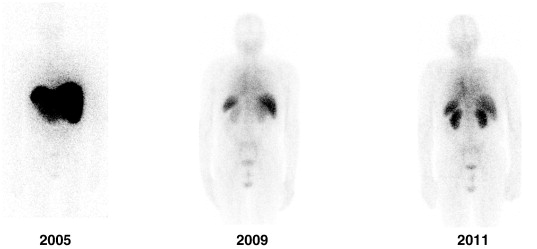
SAP scan images showing progression of AL amyloidosis kidney and liver involvement following chemotherapy

A SAP scan is a type of nuclear medicine imaging test which uses iodine-123 (^{123}I) and serum amyloid P component (SAP) to diagnose amyloidosis.

In patients with amyloidosis, large deposits of SAP coat the affected organs, in addition to the low levels normally found in the blood stream. The injected ^{123}I-SAP localises specifically to amyloid deposits, showing up as hot spots in the image.

== Procedure ==
The radiopharmaceutical is injected into the patient, with imaging taking place on a gamma camera 6-24 hours later. An early blood-pool image provides a baseline for comparison with the organ SAP uptake after 24 hours.

== Availability ==
=== Europe ===
^{123}I-SAP was granted orphan designation by the European Medicines Agency in 2003, however this was withdrawn in 2016.

SAP scanning is only carried out at two European centres; in the United Kingdom from the National Amyloidosis Centre, based at the Royal Free Hospital, and in the Netherlands at University Medical Center Groningen.

=== North America ===
SAP scanning is not approved in the United States due to its use of human blood products.

== See also ==
- DPD scan
