= Organ-limited amyloidosis =

- Specialty: Rheumatology

Organ-limited amyloidosis is a category of amyloidosis where the distribution can be associated primarily with a single organ. It is contrasted to systemic amyloidosis, and it can be caused by several different types of amyloid.

In almost all of the organ-specific pathologies, there is debate as to whether the amyloid plaques are the causal agent of the disease or instead a downstream consequence of a common idiopathic agent. The associated proteins are indicated in parentheses.

== Neurological amyloid ==
- Alzheimer's disease (Aβ 39-43)
- Parkinson's disease (alpha-synuclein)
- Huntington's disease (huntingtin protein)
- Transmissible spongiform encephalopathies caused by prion protein (PrP) were sometimes classed as amyloidoses, as one of the four pathological features in diseased tissue is the presence of amyloid plaques. These diseases include;
  - Creutzfeldt–Jakob disease (PrP in cerebrum)
  - Kuru (diffuse PrP deposits in brain)
  - Fatal familial insomnia (PrP in thalamus)
  - Bovine spongiform encephalopathy (PrP in cerebrum of cows)

== Cardiovascular amyloid ==
- Cardiac amyloidosis
  - Senile cardiac amyloidosis-may cause heart failure

== Other ==
- Amylin deposition can occur in the pancreas in some cases of type 2 diabetes mellitus
- Cerebral amyloid angiopathy
