= Isolated atrial amyloidosis =

- Specialty: Cardiology

Isolated atrial amyloidosis (IAA) is a form of amyloidosis affecting the atria of the heart. It is caused by the deposition of misfolded atrial natriuretic factor (ANP) into the atrial wall.

In most forms of cardiac amyloidosis, amyloid accumulates in all cardiac structures, with the atria manifesting early in the disease due to factors that may include the haemodynamic effects of ventricular diastolic dysfunction, the physical disruption of the atrial wall by infiltrating amyloid, and the toxicity of the amyloid precursors to atrial cardiomyocytes. IAA is "isolated" in the sense that amyloidosis is restricted to the atria, resulting from local overproduction of ANP.

It may cause abnormal heart rhythms.
