= Secondary cutaneous amyloidosis =

- Specialty: Dermatology

Secondary cutaneous amyloidosis is a skin condition that occurs following PUVA therapy and in benign and malignant cutaneous neoplasms in which deposits of amyloid may be found.

== See also ==
- Amyloidosis
- Skin lesion
- List of cutaneous conditions
