= Light chain deposition disease =

- Other names: LCDD
- Schematic diagram of a typical antibody showing two Ig heavy chains (blue) linked by disulfide bonds to two Ig light chains (green). The constant (C) and variable (V) domains are shown.
- Specialty: Oncology

Light chain deposition disease (LCDD) is a rare blood cell disease which is characterized by deposition of fragments of infection-fighting immunoglobulins, called light chains (LCs), in the body. LCs are normally cleared by the kidneys, but in LCDD, these light chain deposits damage organs and cause disease. The kidneys are almost always affected and this often leads to kidney failure. About half of people with light chain deposition disease also have a plasma cell dyscrasia, a spectrum of diseases that includes multiple myeloma, Waldenström's macroglobulinemia, and the monoclonal gammopathy of undetermined significance premalignant stages of these two diseases. Unlike in AL amyloidosis, in which light chains are laid down in characteristic amyloid deposits, in LCDD, light chains are deposited in non-amyloid granules.

== Signs and symptoms ==
Light chain deposition disease can affect any organ. Renal involvement is always present and can be identified by microscopic hematuria and proteinuria. Due to the gradual buildup of light chains from plasma filtration, renal function rapidly declines in the majority of patients with LCDD as either acute tubulointerstitial nephritis or rapidly progressing glomerulonephritis. This condition can include nephrotic syndrome, proteinuria, and/or renal failure. Regardless of the degree of light chain excretion, renal failure happens with a comparable frequency. Furthermore, hypertension may be present at the time of diagnosis in patients with LCDD. Deposits may form in the skin, lungs, gastrointestinal tract, thyroid glands, pancreas, bone marrow, spleen, lymph nodes, and adrenal glands. Extrarenal deposition with symptoms is uncommon. It is unclear if localized LCDD is a real condition or if it is the first sign of a silent systemic LCDD.

The liver is the most common extra-renal site in LCDD, although involvement is not always limited to this organ. There appears to be no relationship between the degree of light chain deposition within the liver and the severity of liver dysfunction. In addition to portal hypertension and hepatic insufficiency, affected patients may die from hepatic failure.

Cardiac involvement may be linked to paroxysmal atrial fibrillation, severe congestive heart failure, and restrictive cardiomyopathy.

The lungs are rarely affected by light chain deposition disease, which typically damages the parenchyma; bronchial involvement seems to be extremely uncommon. However recent reports have indicated that the major airways are involved. There have been descriptions of nodular as well as diffuse pulmonary interstitial diseases; however, the literature has only reported seven occurrences of pulmonary nodular-type LCDD to date.

The effects of systemic protein deposition on the nerves are comparable to those of amyloidosis, which is clinically characterized by polyneuropathy. Deposits may form in the choroid plexus and along nerve fibers. Additionally, isolated LCDD within the brain has been reported.

== Cause ==
LCDD develops as a result of overproduction and thus deposition of abnormal immunoglobulins. About 60% of cases develop in the context of plasmacytoma, multiple myeloma, and other lymphoproliferative disorders. However, in many cases, an underlying cause cannot be identified.

== Mechanism ==
The main light chain structure in LCDD presumably dictates how the disease manifests in the body. Though κI-IV has been described, the sequenced kappa light chains in LCDD are more likely to belong to the V-region subtype, of which VκIV appears to be overrepresented. The pathogenicity of these proteins has not been linked to any particular structural pattern or residue, but a number of recurring characteristics have been identified. Firstly, somatic mutations, not germline mutations, are the source of the amino acid substitutions. Secondly, the region that determines complementarity is where substitutions happen most frequently. Third, hydrophobic residues are more likely to be introduced by the mutations reported in both the kappa and light chains. This could disrupt protein-protein interactions and destabilize the protein, leading to protein deposition in tissues. The propensity for aggregation is exemplified in a murine model of LCDD where light chain deposition was observed in the kidney of transfected mice using vectors that contained kappa light chain sequence from an individual with LCDD with the VκIV subtype. Lastly, because some patients with LCDD have isolates of kappa light chains with mutations that produce new N-glycosylation sites, posttranslational modification can be linked to the creation of pathologic light chains. It is possible that the new hydrophobic residues along with N-glycosylation sites will make it more likely for the light chains to accumulate in the affected tissues' basement membranes. The mesangial cell is also thought to play a role in the pathogenesis of LCDD.

== Diagnosis ==
A number of laboratory tests are required in order to assist in diagnosing LCDD. Blood and urine samples are collected for evaluation of kidney and liver function and determination of the presence of a monoclonal protein. Imaging studies such as echocardiography and an ultrasound of the abdomen will be performed. A CT scan, magnetic resonance imaging (MRI) or positron emission tomography (PET) may also be indicated.

Patients suspected of having LCDD should be evaluated using the screening panel for plasma cell proliferative disorders. However, the sensitivity of laboratory testing strategies for detecting monoclonal gammopathies has increased with the development of quantitative serum assays to test for immunoglobulin free light chain; this increased diagnostic sensitivity is easily noticeable in the monoclonal light chain diseases. The most recent diagnostic screening guidelines state that serum immunofixation in addition to immunoglobulin free light chain is an adequate screening panel for plasma cell proliferative disorders apart from AL amyloidosis and LCDD due to the increased sensitivity for free light chain diseases. It is advised, nevertheless, that urine immunofixation be used in addition to LCDD and AL amyloidosis screening.

The immunohistologic examination of tissue from an afflicted organ—which is not congophilic in nature—confirms the diagnosis of LCDD. The tissue's light chain restriction evaluation will determine whether the heavy or light chain is monoclonal. An abdominal ultrasound and echocardiography should be part of the workup when an individual is diagnosed with LCDD in order to evaluate the spleen, liver, and lymph nodes. A bone marrow aspirate as well as biopsy are necessary to rule out light amyloidosis and/or multiple myeloma.

Similar to cardiac amyloid, diastolic dysfunction and a decrease in myocardial compliance may be discovered via echocardiography and catheterization.

By using specific light chain stains in glomeruli as well as negative Congo red stain, tubular basement membranes, and punctate amorphous, ground-pepper-like appearance of deposits on electron microscopy, LCDD can be differentiated from other causes of nodular sclerosis and mesangial expansion. Diabetic nephropathy exhibits no deposits; fibrillary glomerulonephritis is Congo red negative and has a proliferative appearance along with polyclonal immunoglobulin G; other monoclonal immunoglobulin deposition disease exhibit both light and heavy chain staining or just heavy chain staining. Additional reasons for a membranoproliferative glomerulonephritis pattern exhibit electron microscopy appearances and immunofluorescence specific to the disease.

== Treatment ==
Decreasing production of the organ-damaging light chains is the treatment goal. Options include chemotherapy using bortezomib, autologous stem cell transplantation, immunomodulatory drugs, and kidney transplant. There is no standard treatment for LCDD. High-dose melphalan in conjunction with autologous stem cell transplantation has been used in some patients. A regimen of bortezomib and dexamethasone has also been examined.

== Outlook ==
Different light chain deposition does not appear to have an impact on the clinical course of LCDD patients, as the clinical presentation is known to depend on the quantity and type of affected organs. The median survival time is roughly four years. Following a median follow-up of 27 months, the most comprehensive series to date found that 59% of cases resulted in death and 57% of cases reached uremia. LCDD prognostic factors include age, extrarenal light chain deposition, and plasma cell myeloma.

== Epidemiology ==
Being a relatively rare condition, LCDD is commonly misdiagnosed as a protein disease. Up to 50% of patients receive an LCDD diagnosis as a result of lymphoproliferative disorders such as multiple myeloma. LCDD is diagnosed at a median age of 58 years. LCDD affects men 2.5 times more than women and is frequently linked with monoclonal gammopathies of unknown significance in 17% of patients.

== See also ==
- Monoclonal immunoglobulin deposition disease
- Multiple myeloma
