= Bence Jones protein =

Urinary protein

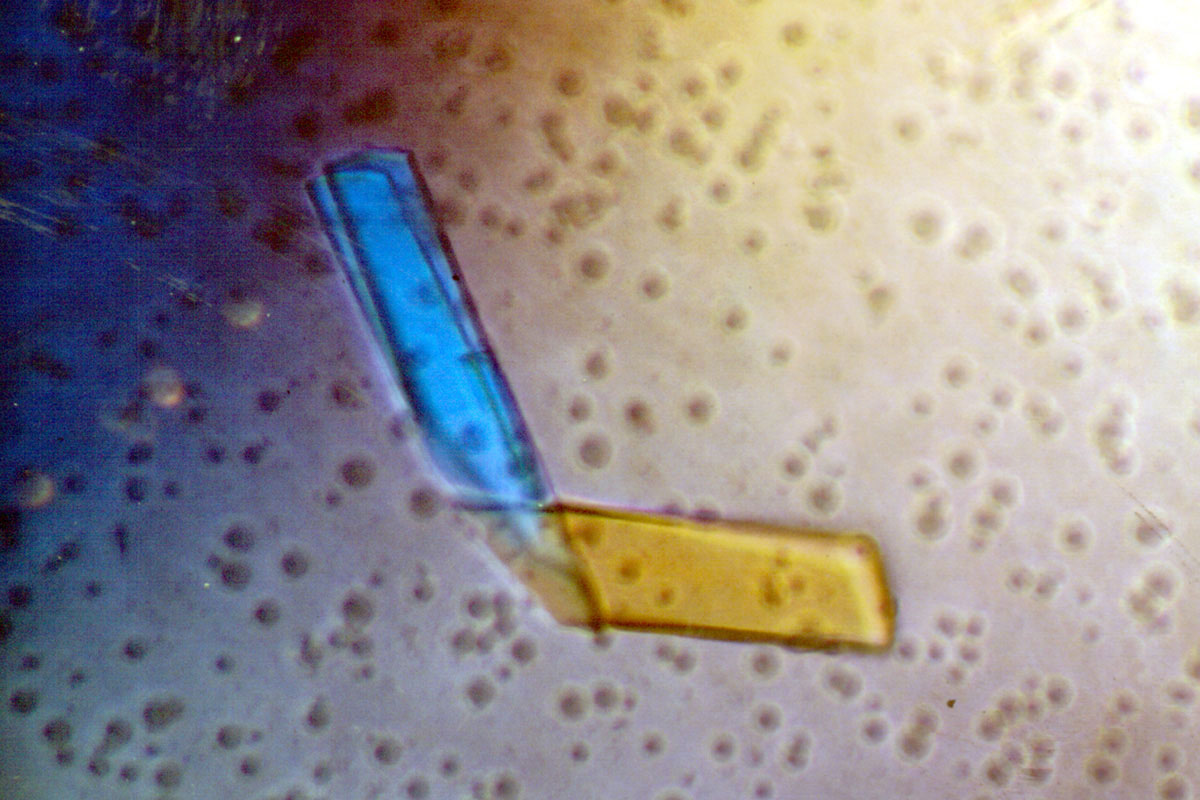
A crystal of Bence Jones protein.

Bence Jones protein is a monoclonal globulin protein or immunoglobulin light chain found in the urine, with a molecular weight of 22–24 kDa. Detection of Bence Jones protein may be suggestive of multiple myeloma, or Waldenström's macroglobulinemia.

Bence Jones proteins are particularly diagnostic of multiple myeloma in the context of target organ manifestations such as kidney failure, lytic (or "punched out") bone lesions, anemia, or large numbers of plasma cells in the bone marrow. Bence Jones proteins are present in 2/3 of multiple myeloma cases.

The proteins are immunoglobulin light chains (paraproteins) and are produced by neoplastic plasma cells. They can be kappa (most of the time) or lambda. The light chains can be immunoglobulin fragments or single homogeneous immunoglobulins. They are found in urine as a result of decreased kidney filtration capabilities due to kidney failure, sometimes induced by hypercalcemia from the calcium released as the bones are destroyed, dehydration due to polyuria, amyloidosis or from the light chains themselves. The light chains were historically detected by heating a urine specimen (which causes the protein to precipitate) and nowadays by electrophoresis of concentrated urine. More recently, serum free light chain assays have been utilised in a number of published studies which have indicated superiority over the urine tests, particularly for patients producing low levels of monoclonal free light chains, as seen in nonsecretory multiple myeloma and amyloid light chain amyloidosis (AL amyloidosis).

== History ==
The Bence Jones protein was described by the English physician Henry Bence Jones in 1847 and published in 1848.
