= Bortezomib/dexamethasone =

Combination drug

Combination of
- Bortezomib: Proteasome inhibitor
- Dexamethasone: Corticosteroid

Clinical data
- Trade names: Vel/Dexm, Vel-Dex, and Veldex

Legal status
- Legal status: US: ℞-only

Bortezomib/dexamethasone is a combination drug against multiple myeloma. When bortezomib is used by the trade name Velcade, the combination is called Vel/Dex (or Vel-Dex or Veldex). Bortezomib is a proteasome inhibitor and dexamethasone is a corticosteroid.
