= Bisalbuminemia =

- Specialty: Clinical chemistry

Bisalbuminemia is the, sometimes inherited, condition of having two types of serum albumin that differ in mobility during electrophoresis. It can be seen in densitometry as a bifid mountain where albumin has 2 heads. Inherited bisalbuminemia has no pathologic effects, but is of interest to researchers who study the evolution and functional changes in the protein.
