= Immunofixation =

Method for detecting monoclonal antibodies

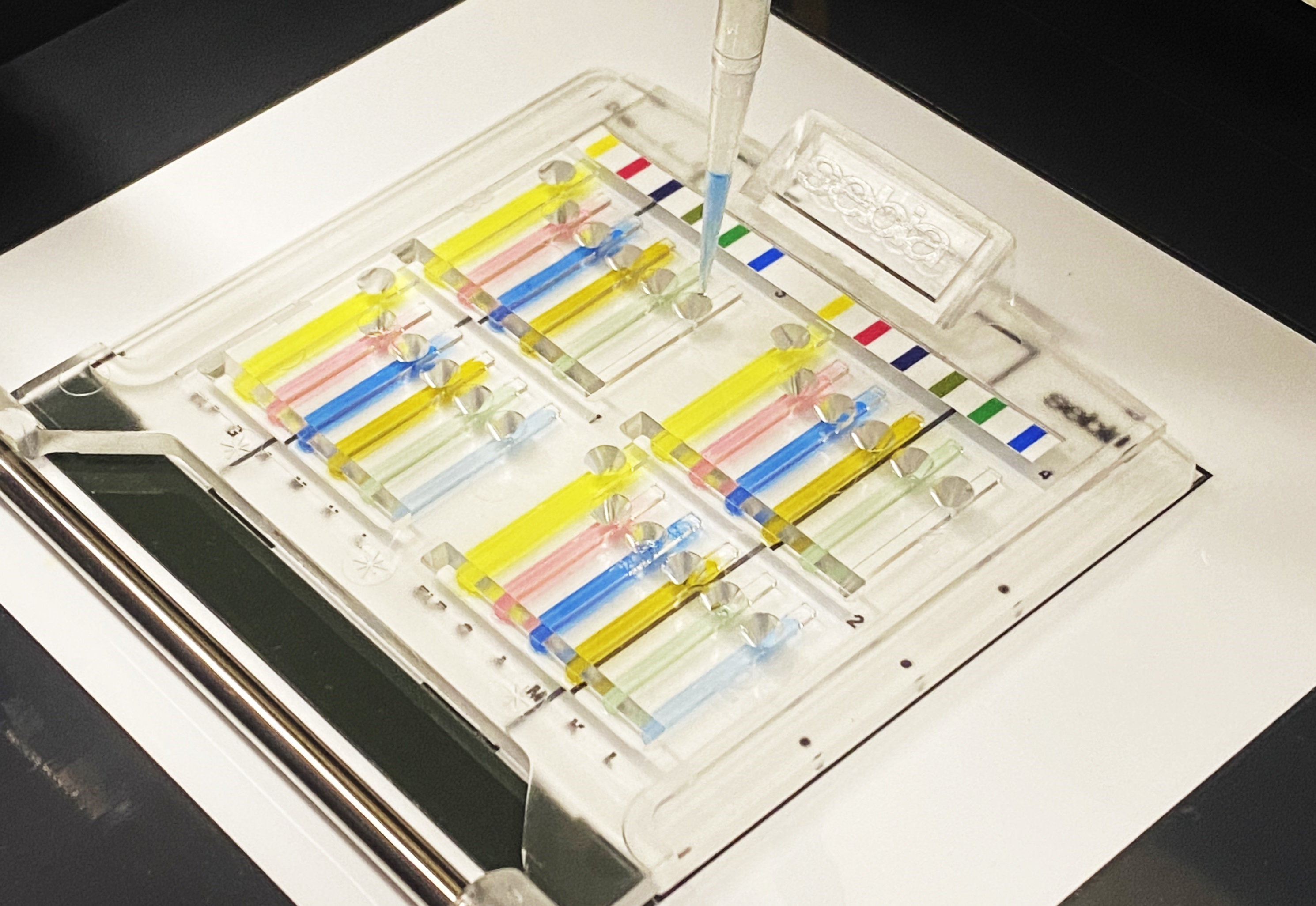
Pipetting anti-immunoglobulins to immunofixation panel. The panel simultaneously tests 4 patients (one in each quadrant). Each patient has 6 electrophoresis panels: The left one is a conventional serum protein electrophoresis. The remainder get solutions with anti-IgG, anti-IgA, anti-IgM, anti-kappa light chain and anti-lambda light chain immunoglobulin, respectively from left to right. Each anti-immunoglobulin solution is artificially colored to ensure that the solution matches the color map at top.

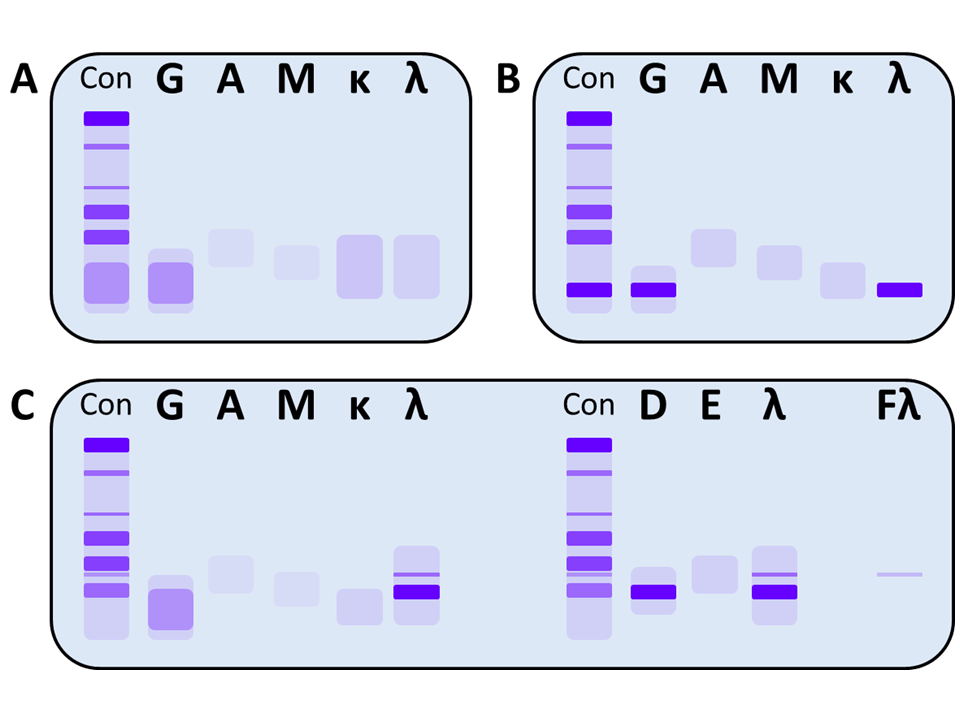
Immunofixation electrophoresis, schematic representation: A. Normal serum; B. Monoclonal intact immunoglobulin IgGλ; C, D. Monoclonal intact immunoglobulin IgDλ and free light chain λ (Fλ).; Con. = Conventional electrophoresis staining of the total protein.

Immunofixation (IFX, also called immunofixation electrophoresis or IFE) permits the simultaneous detection and typing of monoclonal antibodies (immunoglobulins) in serum or urine. It is of great importance for the diagnosis and monitoring of monoclonal gammopathies.

== Principle ==
Monoclonal gammopathies including multiple myeloma and monoclonal gammopathy of unknown significance, are characterised by overproduction of a specific (i.e. monoclonal) antibody by aberrantly behaving (often malignant) B cells. Some monoclonal gammopathies involve overproduction of only a specific free heavy chain (heavy chain disease) or a free light chain (light chain deposition disease).

An antibody is made up of a heavy chain (of type G, M, A, D or E) and a light chain (of type κ or λ). While standard serum protein electrophoresis allows detection of monoclonal gammopathy by the presence of a prominent peak (an M-spike) in the gamma region (or occasionally in the beta or rarely the alpha region), it doesn't give the type of antibody (e.g. IgG-kappa or IgM-lambda), and, importantly, may be unable to confirm whether the peak represents just one monoclonal antibody, several, or is an artefact (e.g. cirrhosis or chronic inflammation can cause changes in electrophoresis protein fractions that can resemble gammopathy).

Immunofixation uses antiserum against each type of heavy and light chain to selectively precipitate and identify those components. A monoclonal gammopathy with present as a prominent band in one or more lanes of the gel. For example, in a multiple myeloma patient with an IgG-κ gammopathy, there will be a prominent band in both the G and κ lanes.

== Technique ==
Immunofixation expands on the standard gel electrophoresis, running the sample in multiple parallel lanes and then selectively staining for specific heavy and light chain types in each gel.

Steps:

1. The one sample undergoes standard gel electrophoresis in 6 parallel lanes.
2. Each lane is overlaid with antisera against one of G, M, or A heavy chain or κ or λ light chain. These antisera selectively bind and precipitate their respective targets. In the control lane all proteins are non-selectively precipitated.
3. The gel is washed, leaving only the precipitated proteins behind.
4. The gel is stained with protein stain (e.g. acid violet or amido black).

If ambiguity remains about the type of antibody present (e.g. if a κ or λ band is seen without a corresponding heavy chain band), further immunofixation may be done staining for the rarer D and E heavy chains, or for "free" κ or λ light chains (i.e. those unbound to a heavy chain. The antisera against free κ and λ targets the region that is usually obscured by the heavy chain).

=== Pros ===
- Immunofixation electrophoresis is the gold standard for diagnosis of monoclonal gammopathy.
- able to distinguish true monoclonal gammopathy from oligoclonal gammopathy or artefact (e.g. beta-gamma bridging cirrhosis can mimic gammopathy)
- able to ensure that an M-spike seen at multiple time points represents the same monoclonal antibody.

=== Cons ===
- more labour-intensive and therefore expensive than plain gel electrophoresis or capillary electrophoresis

== See also ==
- Immunoelectrophoresis

== Sources ==
- fr:Immunofixation
