= Plasma cell leukemia =

- A schematic showing peripheral blood with plasma cell leukemia. Many plasma cells are seen mixed with red cells.
- Specialty: Hematology and oncology

Plasma cell leukemia (PCL) is a plasma cell dyscrasia, i.e. a disease involving the malignant degeneration of a subtype of white blood cells called plasma cells. It is the terminal stage and most aggressive form of these dyscrasias, constituting 2% to 4% of all cases of plasma cell malignancies. PCL may present as primary plasma cell leukemia, i.e. in patients without prior history of a plasma cell dyscrasia or as secondary plasma cell dyscrasia, i.e. in patients previously diagnosed with a history of its predecessor dyscrasia, multiple myeloma. The two forms of PCL appear to be at least partially distinct from each other. In all cases, however, PCL is an extremely serious, life-threatening, and therapeutically challenging disease.

== Signs and symptoms ==
=== Primary PCL ===
The clinical presentation of primary PCL (pPCL) indicates a far more aggressive disease than that of a typical multiple myeloma case with its clinical features being a combination of those found in multiple myeloma and acute leukemia. Like multiple myeloma patients, pPCL patients exhibit pathologically high levels of monoclonal plasma cells in their bone marrow plus a malignant plasma cell-secreted circulating monoclonal myeloma protein, either IgG, IgA, a light chain, or none in 28-56%, 4-7%, 23-44%, or 0-12% of cases, respectively. Similar to B cell leukemias, but unlike multiple myeloma, pPCL patients exhibit relative high frequencies of splenomegaly, lymphadenopathy, hepatomegaly, kidney failure, bone marrow failure (i.e. thrombocytopenia, anemia, and/or, rarely, leukopenia), central nervous system defects, and peripheral neuropathies due to the invasion of these tissues by plasma cells and/or the deposition of their circulating monoclonal immunoglobulin in them. Compared to multiple myeloma patients, pPCL patients also: exhibit 1) high rates of developing a hypercalcemic crisis, i.e. a potentially life-threatening episode of high ionic calcium (Ca^{2+}) levels in the blood due to excess bone re-absorption and/or renal failure; b) higher levels of serum lactate dehydrogenase and Beta-2 microglobulin; and c) lower rates of bone but higher rates of soft tissue plasma cell tumors termed plasmacytomas.

=== Secondary PCL ===
Secondary PCL (sPCL) is diagnosed in 1-4% of patients known to have had multiple myeloma for a median time of ~21 months. It is the terminal phase of these patients' myeloma disease. sPCL patients typically are highly symptomatic due to extensive disease with malignant plasma cell infiltrations in, and failures of, not only the bone marrow but also other organs. They have failed or broken through one or more treatment regimens and therefore may also show some of the toxic effects of these treatments.

== Cause ==
PCL is caused by the development of an excessively high number of genetic abnormalities in plasma cells or, more particularly, their precursor B cells and plasmablasts (see plasma cells). This genetic instability is due to a myriad of acquired abnormalities including gene mutations; single nucleotide polymorphisms; depletions and duplications of parts of a gene, larger portion of a chromosome, or even an entire arm of a chromosome; translocations, deletions, and duplications of entire chromosomes; and increases and decreases in the expression of intact genes due to, e.g. the methylation of gene promotors and various less direct effects. These genetic abnormalities effect the Wnt signaling pathway, regulation of the cell cycle, RNA metabolism, protein folding, and cadherin-related cell adherence to extracellular matrix. These effects in turn control plasma cell proliferation, survival, apoptosis, adhesion to bone marrow, genome stability, and secretion of monoclonal immunoglobulins.

Secondary plasma cell leukemia (sPCL) results from the comparatively slow development of plasma cell/plasma cell precursor genetic abnormalities which initially create a clone of cells that cause the premalignant condition of monoclonal gammopathy of undetermined significance. In a very small percentage of these cases, the progressive development of further genetic abnormalities serially create a clone(s) of plasma cells that cause the more serious but still premalignant disorder of smoldering multiple myeloma, overt myeloma cancer, and ultimately sPCL. In contrast to sPCL, pPCL presents de novo with a broad range of genetic abnormalities. For example, advanced methods for examining the genome viz., whole-exome sequencing and gene expression profiling, have identified 166 non-silent gene variants per pPCL patient sample at the time of diagnosis. These abnormalities are similar but not identical to those detected in sPCL while the abnormalities detected in sPCL more closely resemble those detected in multiple myeloma than do those of pPCL: the genetic data support the clinical data in suggesting that sPCL and pPCL are distinct diseases with sPCL among the two PCLs being more closely related to multiple myeloma. Examination of plasma cell immunophenotype by measuring certain of their cell surface antigens, particularly Cluster of differentiation. CD markers on plasma cells from patients with pPCL differ from those taken from multiple myeloma or sPCL patients. For example: pPCL plasma cells more often express CD20 antigen, which is considered important in anchoring plasma cells to the bone marrow stroma, than do those on plasma cells taken from myeloma patients (50% vs. 17%); pPCL plasma cells often lack CD56 antigen which is present on the majority of plasma cells taken from multiple myeloma patients; and pPCL plasma cells more frequently express CD28 than do sPCL plasma cells. Thus, immunophenotyping supports that notion that multiple myeloma, sPCL, and pPCL show critically important fundamental differences that may explain their different clinical presentations, courses, responses to therapy, and prognoses.

== Diagnosis ==
The International Myeloma Working Group has defined the diagnostic criteria for plasma cell leukemia as the presence in blood of >2 billion plasma cells per liter or, alternatively, >20% of nucleated blood cells being plasma cells. More recently, the Group has suggested that values of 0.5 billion or 5%, respectively, may be more appropriate from a therapeutic viewpoint and therefore should be studied as a definitive criterion for the disease. A recent study supported this suggestion in finding that multiple myeloma patients with >5% circulating plasma cells had a prognosis much worse than that for multiple myeloma and similar to that for plasma cell leukemia. Flow cytometry immunophenotyping of blood cells to detect clonal phenotypes of plasma cells seen in multiple myeloma (e.g. the CD138^{+}, CD38^{+}, CD19^{−}, CD45^{+/-} phenotype) may be a more sensitive method to enumerate circulating clonal plasma cells and diagnose plasma cell leukemia.

== Treatments ==
Prior to the use of newly developed drugs and treatment regimens, median survival rates from the time of diagnosis for pPCL and sPCL were 8–11 months and 2–8 months, respectively, even when treated very aggressively with the VAD regimen of vincristine, doxorubicin, and dexamethasone or the VCMP regimen of vincristine, carmustine, melphalan, and prednisone alternating with vincristine, carmustine, doxorubicin, and prednisone. The treatment of PCL patients, particularly pPCL patients, with newer methods appears to have made modest improvements in survival rates. However, the rarity of these two leukemias has limited individual studies to case reports on a small number of patients or retrospective analyses of patient records. Randomized controlled trials on these patients have not been reported. One flaw of these methods is patient selection bias, i.e. patients selected for treatment with a new regimen may be less ill than average patients with the disease and therefore have an intrinsically less aggressive (i.e. longer overall survival time) disease.

=== Primary plasma cell leukemia ===
Recent case report studies suggest that treatment regimens which include a proteasome inhibitor drug, particularly bortezomib, and/or autologous stem-cell transplantation have improved pPCL survival. For example, 28 patients treated with a bortezomib-based induction regimen followed by autologous stem-cell transplantation and then a maintenance regimen of lenaldomide (an immunosuppressant related to thalidomide), bortezomib, and dexamethasone (a corticosteroid) has a progression free survival rate of 66% at 3 years and an overall survival rate of 73% at 4 years. In one study, patients receiving intensive chemotherapy plus autologous stem-cell transplantation had a median survival of 34 months while those receiving chemotherapy alone had a median survival of 11 months. Two other studies that included bortezomib in their chemotherapy regimens likewise found that the addition of autologous stem-cell transplantation improved results. Current recommendations for treating pPCL often include induction with a three drug regimen such as borezomib-lenalidomide-dexamethasone followed by autologous stem-cell transplantion and consolidation/maintenance with of combination of immunomodulator agents (e.g. thalidomide, lenalidomide, or pomalidomide) plus a proteasome inhibitor (bortezomib, ixazomib, or carfilzomib.

=== Secondary plasma cell leukemia ===
As the end stage of multiple myeloma that has failed or broken through one or more therapeutic regimens, sPCL continues to be highly refractory to various treatment regimens (<50%), very short response times of these regimens, and poor overall survival rates (median survival of 2–8 to months). Patients with sPCL may have short-lived responses to treatment regimens (as communicated in case reports) that include bortezomid but there are no established therapeutic regimens that have clearly been shown to improve their overall or median survival.

== See also ==
- Plasma cell dyscrasia
- Multiple myeloma
