= Plasma cell dyscrasias =

Spectrum of blood disorders

Plasma cell dyscrasia
- Other names: Plasma cell proliferative diseases
- Specialty: Hematology, oncology

In hematology, plasma cell dyscrasias (also termed plasma cell disorders and plasma cell proliferative diseases) are a spectrum of progressively more severe monoclonal gammopathies, usually in which a clone or multiple clones of pre-malignant or malignant plasma cells (sometimes in association with lymphoplasmacytoid cells or B lymphocytes) over-produce and secrete into the blood stream a myeloma protein, i.e. an abnormal monoclonal antibody or portion thereof.

The exception to this rule is the disorder termed non-secretory multiple myeloma; this disorder is a form of plasma cell dyscrasia in which no myeloma protein is detected in serum or urine (at least as determined by conventional laboratory methods) of individuals who have clear evidence of an increase in clonal bone marrow plasma cells and/or evidence of clonal plasma cell-mediated tissue injury (e.g. plasmacytoma tumors). Here, a clone of plasma cells refers to group of plasma cells that are abnormal in that they have an identical genetic identity and therefore are descendants of a single genetically distinct ancestor cell.

At one end of this spectrum of hematological disorders, detection of one of these myeloma proteins in an individual's blood or urine is due to a common and clinically silent disorder termed MGUS, i.e. monoclonal gammopathy of undetermined significance. At the other end of this spectrum, detection of the myeloid protein is due to a hematological malignancy, i.e. multiple myeloma, Waldenström macroglobulinemia, or other B cell-associated neoplasm, that has developed, often in a stepwise manner, from their MGUS precursors.

The clinical importance of understanding this spectrum of diseases is that it can be used to: a) advise individuals on the likelihood of their condition progressing to a malignant phase; b) monitor individuals for the many complications that may occur at any stage of the dyscrasias so that they can be treated to avoid or reduce their clinical impacts; and c) monitor patients for transitions to malignancy so that the malignancy can be treated at an early stage when treatment results are best. Unless otherwise noted, the advice and monitoring given here are those recommended by the International Myeloma Working Group in 2014 and updated in 2016.

== Clonal plasma cells ==
Immunohistochemistry of kappa (κ, left) and lambda (λ, right) immunoglobulin light chains in normal tonsil control tissue, with an approximate κ:λ ratio of 2:1 in the displayed fields, which is normal. An abnormal predominance of one light chain (light-chain restriction) can support a clonal plasma-cell proliferation.

Plasma cells are key effector elements of the adaptive immune system. They contribute to immunity by making antibodies that bind with and thereby initiate the process of neutralizing specific antigens that usually are found on the surface of invading pathogens and foreign substances. Plasma cells develop from B lymphocytes (i.e. B cells) which are stimulated to undergo this maturational development by T lymphocytes during the latter cells' processing of these antigens. As they are stimulated to become plasma cells, B cells refashion parts of their genome in efforts to create a new gene that encodes a functional antibody. In humans, antibodies are composed of two identical heavy chains which are of the gamma (γ), alpha (α), epsilon (ε), delta (δ), or mu (μ) subtypes and two identical light chains which are of the kappa (κ) or lambda (λ) subtypes. Antibodies are classified as IgG, IgA, IgE, IgD, and IgM based on their being made up of γ, α, ε, δ, or μ heavy chains, respectively. Formation of the genes that make these antibodies requires B cells and/or their descendent plasma cells to mutate, break, and recombine various genes at the immunoglobulin heavy chain antigen-binding locus on the long (i.e. "q") arm of human chromosome 14 at position 32.33 (notated as 14q32.33) and the immunoglobulin light chain antigen binding locus on the q arm of chromosome 22 at position 11.2 (i.e. 22 q11.2) by processes termed V(D)J recombination, somatic hypermutation, and immunoglobulin class switching. These genomic changes can go awry by placing a gene that controls cell growth and/or survival adjacent to a normally highly active antibody gene promoter and/or by causing the formation of extra chromosomes (see trisomy) or chromosomes with large deletions that result in the overexpression or under-expression, respectively, of genes that control cell growth and/or survival. In consequence of these "primary genomic changes", an expanding clone of cells develops; overproduces and secretes a monoclonal IgM, IgG, IgA, IgE, or IgD antibody, a κ or λ light chain, an α, γ, or μ heavy chain, or, very rarely, fragments of these proteins; and may accumulate "secondary genomic changes" that cause them to become malignant. The overproduced monoclonal proteins, termed myeloma proteins, commonly circulate in blood, may accumulate in urine, and are the hallmarks of plasma cell dyscrasias including their most malignant forms, viz. multiple myeloma, light chain multiple myeloma, and plasma cell leukemia. IgG-secretory, IgA-secretory, and light-chain secretory multiple myeloma represent 52%, 21%, and 16%, respectively, of all multiple myeloma cases; these myelomas are associated with various types of chromosomal aberrancies and mutations. IgD-secretory multiple myeloma occurs in only 1% to 2% of multiple myeloma cases and is commonly associated with somatic mutations in the gene encoding the gV (i.e. variable) region of the monoclonal antibody. IgE-secretory multiple myeloma has been reported in <50 cases as of 2013 and is characteristically associated with translocations between the q arms of chromosome 11 and 14, i.e. t(11;14)(q13;q32) translocations.

In other cases, plasma cells and/or lymphoplasmacytoid cells (a type of B cell resembling, and possible precursor to, plasma cells) suffer other kinds of mutations that lead to the production of an IgM myeloma protein. Overproduction of this myeloma protein may progress to a different form of plasma cell/lymphoplasmacytoid cell malignancy, Waldenström macroglobulinaemia. Genetic mutations thought to be involved in the development and/or progression of the latter disease include the L265P mutation in the MYD88 gene found in >90% of Waldenström macroglobulinaemia patients as well as various mutations in the CXCR gene found in 27% to 40% of Waldenström macroglobulinaemia patients.

The clonal plasma cells involved in plasma cell dyscrasias exhibit a high degree of genetic instability. For example, the clonal plasma cell population formed by initial genetic alterations that lead to multiple myeloma contains cells that develop further genetic changes that enhance their survival, proliferation, tissue-injuring, and metastatic capacities. This allows the new cell clones to crowd out older cell clones and thereby establish a more malignant disease. Repetition of such genetic changes underlie the evolution of a clinically silent plasma cell dyscrasia to an overt malignancy. The progressive genetic changes in clonal plasma cells include accumulating numerous single nucleotide polymorphisms, increases and decreases in gene and chromosome copy numbers, and chromosomal translocations. Genes affected include those regulating genome stability itself (e.g. KIF2B) as well as cellular activation, proliferation, and apoptosis (e.g. CIDEC, TP52, ATM, KRAS, NRAS, Wnt, and NF-κB). In the most malignant form of plasma cell dyscrasias, primary plasma cell leukemia, the plasma cell population contains >1900 distinct DNA alterations in >600 genes.

In general, the plasma cell dyscrasias are defined by 1) the presence of these genetically unstable clonal plasma cells, lymphoplasmacytoid cells, or B cells infiltrating the bone marrow or forming distinct masses in bone, and/or other tissues as defined by biopsy of involved tissues and 2) the presence of these cells' myeloma proteins (i.e. intact monoclonal antibody, free light chain, free heavy chain, shortened version of these proteins, or any combination of these proteins) in blood and/or urine as defined by various types of gel electrophoresis. Obviously, the latter criterion does not apply to the rare cases of true non-secretory myeloma.

== Myeloma protein toxicity ==
Myeloma proteins form as a result of gene mutations rather than physiological gene remodeling responses to an instigating foreign antigen: typically these proteins are non-functional. However, they sometimes cause serious tissue damage with the kidney being a particularly vulnerable target. The toxic effects of monoclonal proteins may occur at early stages in the plasma cell dyscrasia spectrum and require treatment independently of the mass or tissue-destructive effects of the myeloma protein-producing cells. Myeloma protein toxicities include:

- Monoclonal free light chains, free heavy chains, or a mixture of these chains can deposit in the kidney and other organs to cause systemic monoclonal immunoglobulin deposition disease; free κ or λ light chains can deposit selectively in the kidney's proximal tubule to cause light chain proximal tubulopathy or in the kidney's distal tubule to cause light chain myeloma cast nephropathy; and various myeloma proteins can deposit selectively in the kidney's glomeruli to cause various forms of organized deposit and non-organized deposit glomerulonephritis diseases.
- Free κ or λ light chains can aggregate with each other to cause extracellular amyloid deposits and a disease termed amyloidosis in which the deposits injure and ultimately lead to the failure of such organs as the kidney, heart, liver, stomach, and intestines; these deposits can also cause peripheral and autonomic neuropathies.
- IgM myeloma proteins or in rare cases other myeloma proteins such as IgA, free κ light chains, or free λ light chains may increase blood viscosity, deposit in peripheral blood vessels, and thereby cause vascular occlusion and gangrene of the extremities in the syndrome termed cryoglobulinemia.
- Monoclonal IgM myeloma proteins operating through their effects on increasing blood hyperviscosity can reduce blood flow to the central nervous system to cause blurred vision, headaches, vertigo, ataxia, and cold-induced hemolytic anemia.
- IgM, IgG, and to lesser extents κ and λ free light chain myeloma proteins can cause Immune thrombocytopenic purpura with extensive bleeding tendencies .

== Stages ==
=== MGUS stage ===
Monoclonal gammopathy of undetermined significance (MGUS), is defined as the presence in the blood or urine of a monoclonal antibody, antibody heavy chain, or antibody light chain in a person lacking symptoms or signs of a more serious plasma cell dyscrasia. The condition is typically discovered as an incidental finding when serum protein electrophoresis is done for various reasons unrelated to plasma cell dyscrasias. Protein electrophoresis generally detects one of the following patterns of monoclonal myeloma protein spikes representing: a) intact IgG, IgA, IgE, IgE, or IgM; b) intact IgG, IgA, IgE, IgD, or IgM plus high concentrations of a free (i.e. not bound to a heavy chain) κ or λ light chain; c) a free κ chain in great excess of a λ chain or a free λ chain in great excess of a κ chain; and d) free γ, δ, or μ heavy chains unbound to a light chain (free α and ε heavy chain myeloma protein spikes have not been reported). Among MGUS cases expressing an intact antibody, 70%, 15%, 12%, and 3% express either IgG, IgM, IgA, or two of these M proteins, respectively, with or without excessive levels of a light chain; these cases represent ~80% of all MGUS. About 20% of MGUS cases express either κ or λ light chains. As a group, these MGUS findings occur more commonly in men and are ~2-fold more common in individuals of African descent than Caucasians. MGUS cases expressing free γ, δ, or μ heavy chains are extremely rare. MGUS is categorized into the following sub-types based upon the identity and levels of the myeloma proteins detected as well as the prognoses for progressive disease indicated by these myeloma protein findings.

==== Non-IgM MGUS ====
Non-IgM MGUS, commonly termed MGUS, is diagnosed in individuals who exhibit a serum IgG, IgD, IgA, or IgE monoclonal protein with or without increased levels of blood and/or urine free κ or λ light chains. These patients typically also show small increases in bone marrow plasma cells. Further requirements for the diagnosis of non-IgM MGUS are: a) bone marrow clonal plasma cells <10% of total nucleated cells; b) absence of any of the four CRAB criteria (CRAB criteria are C = Calcium serum levels >1 milligram/deciliter above normal values and/or a serum level >11 milligram/deciliter; R = Renal insufficiency as defined by a glomerular filtration rate <40 milliliter/minute and/or a serum creatinine >2 gram/deciliter due to myeloma protein-induced kidney damage; A = Anemia, as defined by a blood hemoglobin level >2 gram/deciliter below normal and/or <10 gram/deciliter due to the plasma cell dyscrasia rather than e.g. iron deficiency or blood loss; B = Bone lesions, i.e. ≥1 lytic (i.e. bone re-adsorbing) bone lesion due to a plasmacytoma as detected by skeletal radiography, computed tomography, or positron emission tomography-computed tomography); c) no evidence of a plasmacytoma in bone or soft tissues, of amyloidosis, or of another plasma cell disorder; d) a ratio of free serum light chains (i.e. free κ/λ or λ/κ light chain ratio) less than 100, providing that the higher light chain concentration is >100 milligram/liter; and e) a circulating blood plasma cell absolute count of <2 billion and/or <20% of total circulating nucleated cells. Presence of any one of the latter findings indicates that the plasma cell dyscrasia has progressed beyond the MGUS stage.

Non-IgM MGUS is a relatively stable condition afflicting 3% of people aged 50 and 5% of people aged 70; on average, it progresses to multiple myeloma at a rate of 0.5-1% cases per year, as defined in studies following patients over a 25-year period. A study conducted by the Mayo Clinic found that MGUS associated with non-IgG myeloma proteins or with serum myeloma protein levels greater than 15 gram/liter had a greater risk per year of progression to multiple myeloma. A Spanish study group found that MGUS patients demonstrating aneuploidy (i.e. abnormal number of chromosomes) in bone marrow cells or >95% of resident bone marrow plasma cells that are clonal in nature also have a greater risk per year of progression to myeloma. In a more recent study, MGUS patients that had the presence of none, 1, 2, or 3 of the three following risk factors, serum M protein levels >15 gram/liter, a non-IgG isotype, and abnormal free light chain ratios, had 5, 32, 37, and 58% chances, respectively, of progressing to multiple myeloma within 20 years. In another study, MGUS patients with none, 1, or 2 of the following risk factors, >95% of bone marrow plasma cells that are clonal in nature and a 10% or greater rise in the levels of their monoclonal proteins within 3 years, had 2, 16, and 72% risks, respectively, of progression within 7 years. However, estimates on the risks of progression for some of these parameters are tentative and subject to change. For example, the IgA form of MGUS, while once considered to have a poorer prognosis than IgG MGUS, was found to have a prognosis similar to IgG MGUS in a more recent study.

==== IgM MGUS ====
While traditionally classified as such, it is not clear that IgM MGUS is a clonal plasma cell dyscrasia. IgM MGUS involves an increase in a B cell derivative with morphological features of both plasma cells and lymphocytes viz., lymphoplasmacytic cells. Studies indicate that both plasma cells and lymphoblastic cells infiltrate involved tissues and that one or perhaps both cell types harbor mutations in a) the MYD88 gene (~20% in IgM MGUS and >90% in IgM-related malignancies), almost all of which are L265P mutations (i.e. changing leucine to proline at the 265th amino acid position of the MYK88 protein thereby causing the protein to be continuously active in stimulating the same cell-activating pathways that Toll-like receptors activate intermittently and on a physiologically basis); b) the CXCR4 gene (8% in IgM MGUS, 25% in IgM-related malignancies); and c) increased gene copy number due to chromosomal rearrangements (36% in IgM MGUS, 82% in IgM-related malignancies). It is clear that each cell type contributes to different features of IgM malignancies but not clear that clonal plasma cells are critical to the development or progression of IgM MGUS. In all events, IgM MGUS is diagnosed in individuals who have serum IgM levels less than 30 gram/liter; have less than 10% of nucleated bone marrow cells with the lymphoplasmacytic morphology, and have no symptoms or findings of end organ dysfunction attributed to Waldenström macroglobulinemia such as anemia, decreases in any white blood cell count, cold agglutinin disease, hyperviscosity of blood, lymphadenopathy, hepatomegaly, splenomegaly, peripheral neuropathy, cryoglobulinemia, or constitutional symptoms.

There may be a modest increase in the incidence of IgM MGUS in people of African descent. A study of 213 individuals diagnosed with IgM MGUS found that 10% at 5 years and 24% in 15 years progressed to more serious IgM-related diseases including non-Hodgkin lymphoma, Waldenstorm's macroglobulinemia, systemic amyloidosis, and chronic lymphocytic leukemia. A second long-term study of 116 individuals with IgM MGUS found a 15-fold increased risk of progressing to a lymphoid malignancy, mostly to Waldenstorm's macroglobulinemia. In general, progression to one of these malignant outcomes occurs at a rate of 2% to 3% per year. Individuals with higher serum IgM or lower serum albumin levels progress at faster rates than those with normal levels of these parameters.

==== Light chain MGUS ====
Individuals diagnosed with light chain MGUS typically do not express detectable levels of an IgG, IgA, IgD, IgE, or IgM intact myeloma protein in their blood. Rather, they overexpress a monoclonal, aberrant free κ (i.e. kappa) or λ (i.e., lambda) immunoglobulin light chain. For diagnosis, the κ and λ free light chains are quantified by immunological methods and the ratio of κ to λ light chains is used to detect unbalanced light chain synthesis that is indicative of a monoclonal light chain plasma cell dyscrasia. Light chain MGUS is defined as a disorder in which a serum κ to λ free light chain ratio falls outside the normal range of 0.26–1.65 (mean =0.9) provided that it is not associated with: a) any of the CRAB criteria, b) a bone marrow plasma cell count of 10 or a higher percentage of nucleated cells, c) evidence of amyloid deposition (see Light chain deposition disease), and d) an accumulation of 0.5 or more grams of the monoclonal light chain in the urine over a 24-hour period. As so defined, light chain MGUS comprises ~19% of all MGUS cases, occurs in ~0.8% of the general population, and progresses to light chain multiple myeloma at the very slow rate of 0.3 cases per 100 years.

Some early studies have reported that a very rapid rate of progression occurs in light chain MGUS patients who have free light chain κ/λ or λ/κ ratios equal to or greater than 100 (i.e. and κ/λ ratio outside of 0.02 to 100). About 80% of individuals bearing these light chain ratios were found to progress to light chain multiple myeloma within 2 years. In consequence, these individuals were recommended for being diagnosed and treated as having light chain multiple myeloma. However, two more recent studies reported a 2-year progression rate for these patients of 64% and 30%. It is therefore suggested that the diagnosis of light chain multiple myeloma based solely on a free κ/λ light chain ratio outside of 0.02 to 100 may be premature.

==== Monoclonal gammopathy of renal significance ====
Monoclonal gammopathy of renal significance or MGRS designates any MGUS disorder that has a clinically significant impact on renal function. MGRS can be caused by the deposition of a monoclonal immunoglobulin in, and consequent injury to, the kidneys. The diagnosis of this form of MGRS is made based on the presence of: 1) a disorder meeting the criteria for MGUS; b) decreased kidney function as evidence by, e.g. a Glomerular filtration rate of <40; and c) biopsy confirmed or suspicion of cast nephropathy, glomerulonephritis, of other morphological expressions of clonal immunoglobulin-induced kidney injury. Increased excretion of a urinary monoclonal light chain (typically >0.5 gram/day), which suggests the presence of a particularly severe form of kidney injury (myeloma cast nephropathy), supports but is not a requirement for the diagnosis of MGRS. The disorder can also be caused by a monoclonal immunoglobulin that acts as an autoantibody that activates the blood complement system to cause complement-related kidney injury. This form of MGRS is usually associated with other syndromes like glomerulopathy associated with a monoclonal immunoglobulin or C4 dense deposit disease associated with a monoclonal immunoglobulin. Diagnosis depends or identifying these other syndromes and the identification of complement components on kidney biopsy.

Regardless of the exact pathophysiology causing monoclonal immunoglobulin-induced kidney injury, MGRS has a greater morbidity and mortality than other forms of MGUS. Since renal dysfunction usually improves with therapy directed at the underlying plasma cell dyscrasia, MGRS may warrant treatment even when other parameters of plasma cell dyscrasia severity (e.g. low levels of serum monoclonal immunoglobulin and bone marrow plasma cells) suggest the presence of minimal, non-malignant disease.

=== Smoldering multiple myeloma stage ===
Smoldering multiple myeloma or SMM (also termed smoldering myeloma) is the next stage following MGUS in the spectrum of plasma cell dyscrasias. While still considered a pre-malignant condition, its chances of progressing to a malignant plasma cell dyscrasia are generally greater than that for MGUS. SMM consists of the following subtypes which represent progression of their corresponding MGUS subtypes.

==== Non-IgM SMM ====
Non-IgM SMM (also termed IgG and IgA SMM because of the rarity of IgD and IgE SMM) is diagnosed in asymptomatic individuals based on criteria identical to those listed above for Non-IgM MGUS except that: their intact IgG or IgA myeloma protein levels are equal to or greater than 30 grams/liter rather than 15 grams/liter; their bone marrow shows plasma cells comprise between 10% and <60% rather than <10% of nucleated cells; and/or their 24-hour urine contains 0.5 gram or greater levels of Bence Jones, i.e. light chain myeloma, proteins. individuals must also lack evidence of more recently established multiple myeloma-defining criteria viz., CRAB features, amyloidosis, more than one solitary plasmacytoma, and/or serum or urine free light chain κ to λ or λ to κ ratios of 100 or greater.

Overall, the risk of Non-IgM SMM progressing to multiple myeloma is 10% per year for the first 5 years but falls off sharply to 3% per year for the next 5 years and thereafter to 1% per year.

==== Smoldering Waldenström macroglobulinemia ====
Smoldering Waldenström macroglobulinemia is diagnosed in asymptomatic individuals that have a serum IgM level 30 gram/liter and/or a bone marrow lymphoplasmacytoid cell infiltrate >10% of total nucleated cells. These cases should have no symptoms or findings of end organ dysfunction attributed to Waldenström macroglobulinemia such as anemia, decreases in any white blood cell count, cold agglutinin disease, hyperviscosity of blood, lymphadenopathy, hepatomegaly, splenomegaly, peripheral neuropathy, cryoglobulinemia, or constitutional symptoms.

As determined by a Mayo Clinic study of 48 individuals, smoldering Waldenström macroglobulinemia's risk of progression to Waldenström macroglobulinemia is estimated to be ~12% per year and then falling of sharply for at least the next 5 years to 2% per year. In this study the only factor predictive of a more rapid progress was a finding of anemia (hemoglobin level <115 grams/liter). During a 15-year follow-up, the Clinic subsequently reported that patients progressed to Waldenström macroglobulinemia, amyloidosis, or a related IgM-associated neoplasm at a rate of 6%, 39%, 59%, and 68% after the first, third, fifth, and tenth year, respectively. However, the Southwest Oncology Group in a study on 231 individuals reported that the smoldering disease progressed to overt Waldenström macroglobulinemia over 9 years in only 26% of cases.

==== Light chain SMM ====
Light chain smoldering multiple myeloma (light chain SMM) was previously termed idiopathic Bence Jones proteinuria. The condition is currently diagnosed in asymptomatic individuals who have a 24-hour urinary Bence Jones, i.e. light chain myeloma protein level, that is >0.5 grams and/or bone marrow plasma cells that are 10% to <60% of nucleated cells. These individuals must also; lack detectable IgG, IgA, IgD, IgE, or IgM myeloma proteins in sera; have a free κ/λ or λ/κ light chain ratio outside of 0.26 to 1.65 range but less than 100; and/or have no evidence for the presence of any one of the CRAB criteria, amyloidosis, or end organ damage attributable to the myeloma proteins or plasma cells.

In a Mayo clinic study of 101 individuals with light chain SMM, the cumulative probability of progression to active multiple myeloma or light-chain amyloidosis in patients with light-chain SMM was 28%, 45%, and 56% after 5, 10, and 15 years, respectively. The major risk factors for progression were the level of urinary excretion of M protein, percentage of bone marrow plasma cells, and immunoparesis (i.e. reduced serum levels of intact immunoglobulins).

=== Paraneoplastic complications ===
Serious and potentially life-threatening paraneoplastic complications can occur in plasma cell dyscrasias regardless of tumor cell burden, myeloma protein levels, or the presence of other criteria suggesting the dyscrasia has entered a malignant phase. Many of these complications are caused by the tissue-destructive effects of the myeloma proteins, are predictive of a rapidly progressive disease, and require chemotherapeutic or other treatments directed at lowering the burden of the myeloma protein-producing cells. The serious paraneoplasitic diseases that complicate the plasma cell dyscrasias and may require such treatments include the following.

==== Amyloidosis ====
Amyloidosis is a general term for a protein misfolding syndrome that involves the deposition of a low molecular weight beta-pleated sheet-containing protein in extracellular tissues. These proteins normally circulate in the blood but may undergo conformational changes that cause them to auto-aggregate along their beta-pleated sheets to become insoluble and form fibril deposits in and outside of the circulation. These deposits disrupt tissue architecture and, in the case of light chains, directly injure cells, thereby causing potentially cataclysmic organ failures. There are 31 types of circulating proteins that can become misfolded and lead to distinctly different types of amyloidosis; among these, myeloma proteins, particularly free light chains, are the predominant cause of the disease. Increases in the levels of free κ or λ light chains are a common feature of plasma cell dyscrasias. These increases occur in: 40% of IgM MGUS, IgM SMM, and Waldenstroms macroglbulonemia cases; 60% to 70% of non-secretory multiple myelom cases; 90% to 95% of intact immunoglobulin multiple myeloma cases; and, by definition, 100% of light chain multiple myeloma cases. There are two different types of plasma cell dyscrasia-associated amyloidosis syndromes: amyloid light chain amyloidosis (AL amyloidosis) in which amyloid deposits consist of free light chains and amyloid heavy chain amyloidosis (AH amyloidosis) in which amyloid deposits contain only free heavy chains. The deposits in a third type, AHL amyloidosis, consists of both free light chains and free heavy chains. AHL amyloidosis is here, as in some recent reports, grouped with AH amyloidosis.

===== AL Amyloidosis =====
AL amyloidosis can occur at any stage in the plasma cell dyscrasia spectrum. Typically, patients developing this type of amyloidosis have had excess κ or λ free light chains in their urine for years before diagnosis. At diagnosis, however, they typically have a relatively small plasma cell burden (bone marrow plasma cells <5% to 7% of total nucleated cells) and in only <5% to 10% of cases do other findings indicate the presence of a malignant condition (i.e. definitive signs of multiple myeloma, Waldenström macroglobulinemia, or chronic lymphocytic leukemia associated with over-production of a clonal light chain). Nonetheless, these individuals often evidence serious involvement of the kidney (proteinuria, nephrotic syndrome) or heart (restrictive cardiomyopathy, arrhythmias) in 70% or 60% of cases, respectively, and of dysfunction in the peripheral nervous system (numbness, paresthesias) or autonomic nervous system (orthostatic hypotension) in 20% or 15% of cases, respectively. They may also exhibit evidence of liver involvement (liver failure, increases in circulating liver enzymes, bleeding due to factor X deficiency), gastrointestinal track deficiencies (malabsorption), and amyloid deposition in surface tissues (macroglossia, shoulder pad masses, cutaneous nodules). Arthritis in multiple joints, often manifested before diagnosis, is also a common feature of AL amyloidosis and has led to initial misdiagnoses of rheumatoid arthritis. Diagnosis of the disease requires evidence of increased levels of a κ or λ myeloma protein in blood and/or blood, presence of an amyloid-related organ-involvement syndrome, detection in tissues of amyloid deposition based on birefringence-staining with Congo red, and detection in tissues of κ or λ deposition based on electron microscopy or mass spectrometry. Reflecting the widespread systemic nature of the disease, patient median survival is only 8 months dating from the time of diagnosis. Treatment commonly improves this poor survival. In a Mayo Clinic study, for example, AL amyloidosis assigned stage 1, 2, 3, or 4 based on the presence of 0, 1, 2, or 3 prognostic signs (high blood levels of [cardiac troponin T]), blood levels of a marker for congestive heart failure (viz., NT-ProBNP), or free light chain ratios) had median survivals of 94.1, 40.3, 14, and 5.8 months respectively. Additional factors indicating a worse prognosis include the involvement of multiple organs, ≥ 10% bone marrow plasma cells, presence of a translocation between chromosomes 11 and 14 [i.e. t(11;14)], and chromosomal trisomy.

===== AH Amyloidosis =====
AH and AHL amyloidosis are extremely rare forms of systemic amyloidosis in which the amyloid deposit is a free heavy chain (AH amyloidosis) or a free heavy chain plus free light chain (AHL amyloidosis). Case reports have detected amyloid deposits containing a free γ, α, or μ heavy chain (or portions of one of these chains) accompanied in many cases by a free κ or λ light chain in primarily in the kidney but also the spleen and other tissues. AH plus AHL amyloidosis cases are ~17-fold less common than AL amyloidosis cases. The disease often presents late in its course with signs and/or symptoms of kidney failure such as those associated with the nephrotic syndrome and is therefore treated as a malignant condition. In a small study of 16 patients with renal amyloidosis, the 5 patients with AH amyloidosis and the 11 patients with AHL amyloidosis had less frequent concurrent cardiac involvement and better overall survival than 202 patients with renal AL amyloidosis. The hematological response to chemotherapy of the AH and AHL renal amyloidosis patients was comparable to those with renal AL amyloidosis.

==== POEMS syndrome ====
POEMS syndrome (also known as Crow–Fukase syndrome, Takatsuki disease, or PEP syndrome) is a rare and complex medical syndrome that involves a combination of syndrome-defining signs and symptoms due to the dysfunction of multiple organs. The syndrome is associated with a plasma cell dyscrasia in almost 100% of cases, pathological overexpression of certain cytokines in >95% of cases, and the lymphoproliferative disorder termed Castleman's disease in ~15% of cases. (Rare cases of POEMS have been associated with polyclonal rather than clonal plasma cells; these cases are not plasma cell dyscrasias but rather appear to be caused by the over-activity of non-malignant immune cell responses in chronic infections or autoimmune diseases.) POEMS is an acronym standing for the characteristic signs or symptoms of the syndrome: Polyneuropathy, Organomegaly, Endocrinopathy, Plasma cell disorder (typically, the plasma cell burden is low in POEMS patients), and Skin changes (e.g. hemangioma, hyperpigmentation). The syndrome is defined by the presence of; both of two major criteria, peripheral neuropathy and a clonal plasma cell dyscrasia (increased bone marrow plasma cells in ~67% of cases; ≥1 plasmacytoma in ~33% of cases); at least one other major criteria (Castleman's disease, sclerotic bone lesions, elevated serum levels of the cytokine VEGF); and at least one minor criterion (organomegaly, extravascular volume overload [e.g. ascites, edema, pleural effusion, and/or pericardial effusion], endocrinopathy [i.e. hypogonadism, defects in the hypothalamic–pituitary–adrenal axis], skin changes, papilledema, and/or hematological manifestations [i.e. thrombocytosis or polycythemia]). The monoclonal protein in POEMS patients is typically identified as IgA or IgG which in >95% of cases contains a λ chain that is restricted to either of two members of the V lambda 1 subfamily viz., IGLV1-40*01 and IGLV1-44*01 (there are 29 other members in the V lambda family). That is, the myeloma protein in POEMS is almost invariably a clonal λ light chain variant. Deletion of chromosome 13 and chromosomal translocations but not increases in chromosome number have also been reported to occur in POEMS patients.

Patients with 1 or 2 isolated plasmacytomas have been successfully treated with targeted radiotherapy to obtain relief of symptoms and sometimes complete remission of disease. (Isolated plasmacytomas may regress spontaneously.) Patients with >2 plasmacytomas or symptomatic disseminated disease have been treated with chemotherapy often followed by autologous stem-cell transplantation; these treatments have been found to reduce symptoms of the disease and lead to long-term partial remissions of disease. The overall survival of POEMS patients who have been treated for their disease is relatively good for a disease occurring in patients with an average age of 50 years; one estimate of median overall survival is 14 years. POEMS patients evaluated to be in low and intermediate risk groups had ≥>85% survival at 10 years; those in the high risk group had a 40% survival over this time period.

==== Cryoglobulinemia ====
Cryoglobulins are proteins, principally immunoglobulins, that circulate in the blood, precipitate at temperatures <37 °C (98.6 °F), and re-solubilize upon restoring physiological blood temperatures. They are made and secreted into the blood as a result of underlying pathological conditions viz., inflammation, infection, or malignancies. Rarely, cryoglobulinemia (i.e. essential cryoglobulinemia) occurs in patients without these or other identifiable conditions. Non-essential cryoglobulinemia is classified into three types. Type 1 cryoglobulinemia (10-25% of cases) involves a circulating myeloma protein, typically IgM or IgG but in rare case reports IgA. The condition is associated with Waldenström macroglobulinemia or multiple myeloma in ~40% of type I cases, the MGUS or smoldering predecessors to these diseases in ~44% of type I cases, and other B cell lymphoproliferative disorders in ~16% of type I cases. Type II cryglobulinemia (50-60% of cases) involves circulating IgM myeloma protein with rheumatoid factor activity and therefore bound to polyclonal IgG and protein components of the blood complement system; hepatitis C virus and, far more rarely, hepatitis B virus or human immunodeficiency virus infections are the major causes of this cryoglobulinemia. Type III cryoglobulinemia (15-30% of cases) involves circulating polyclonal IgM protein with rheumatoid factor activity bound to polyclonal IgG and blood complement components; autoimmune diseases and, less commonly, hepatitis virus C infection or lymphoproliferative disorders are the cause of this type of croglobulinemia. Only types I and II are defined as plasma cell dyscrasias.

Patients suffering type 1 cryoglobulinemia present with symptoms due to cold temperature-induce blood hyperviscosity and consequential interruptions of blood flow, e.g. skin lesions (lower extremity purpuric spots and papules, acrocyanosis, necrosis skin ulcers, livedo reticularis urticaria), peripheral neuropathy, blurred vision, loss of vision, hearing loss, headaches, confusion, transient ischemic attacks, chest pain, heart failure, glomerulonephritis, kidney failure, oral bleeding, and nasal bleeding. Rarely, patients may present with catastrophic decreases in blood flow to vital tissues and require emergency treatment. Symptomatic patients typically exhibit levels of a myeloma protein >5 gram/liter and can be diagnosed by simple observing the temperature-induced, reversible induction of serum precipitate formation. Patients, particularly those with catastrophic presentations, are treated with plasma exchange and/or plasmapharesis to reduce the load of circulating myeloma proteins and relieve acute symptoms. Patients with an overt malignancy are treated with the chemotherapy regimens used for Waldenstroms macroglobulinemia or multiply myeloma; patients with MGUS precursors to these diseases appear less responsive to these chemotherapeutic regimens. These patients as well as patients with overt malignancy may be treated with rituximab (kills normal and malignant B cells that bear the CD20 antigen or the proteasome inhibitor, Bortezomib.

Patients suffering type II (or type III) cryoglobulinemia present with many of the symptoms of type I disease plus those of inflammatory vasculitis. Their treatments are tailored to the underlying infectious, autoimmune, or malignant disease. Type II patients associated with a monoclonal antibody and clonal plasma cells or other types of clonal B cells, are typically treated with regimens used for Walsdenstorms macroglobulonemia or multiple myeloma.

=== Malignant stage ===
In the malignant stage of plasma cell dyscrasias, a clearly excessive tumor cell burden causes symptoms and findings predictive of rapid, life-threatening progression of disease. These dyscrasias fall into several distinct categories.

==== Solitary plasmacytoma ====
Solitary plasmacytoma is an early stage malignancy with a clinical course that lies between MGUS and multiple myeloma in the spectrum of plasma cell dyscrasias. Solitary plasmacytomas typically present with local symptoms due to the growing mass of plasma cells such as the bone pain or pathologic bone fractures occurring in solitary plasmacytomas of bone or the headache, focal neurological deficits, and cranial nerve palsies occurring in extramedullary plasmacytomas of sellar and parasellar compartments of the brain. Its diagnoses must meet all four of the following criteria: biopsy-proven tumor consisting of clonal plasma cells; no evidence of any other plasmacytomas based on bone survey and MRI (or in place of MRI, CT scan); normal bone marrow examination; and absence end organ damage, CRAB features, or other signs or symptoms of systemic disease attributable to a plasma cell dyscrasia. Blood or urine myeloma proteins are usually undetectable or low in solitary plasmacytomas. Solitary plasmacytoma is a rare disease with an incidence in the USA of <450 cases per year. In a review of 1,691 cases in the US, the median age at diagnosis was 63 with males representing ~60% of all cases. The most common site of plasmacytoma involvement was bone (~58%) followed by upper or lower airway tract (~16%), soft tissue or connective tissue (~5%), central nervous system (~3%), gastrointestinal tract (~3%), skin (~1%), and all other sites (~3%). Overall median survival was 8.12 years with survival decreasing with age from 12.4 years for patients <40 to 5.2 years for patients of 60 years or older. Risk of its recurrence or progression to overt multiple myeloma within 3 years is ~10%.

A subset of solitary plasmacytomas, termed solitary plasmacytoma with minimal bone marrow involvement, has the same criteria for diagnosis as solitary plasmacytoma except that bone marrow examination shows an increase in plasma cells from a normal value of ~0% to 1.5% to >~1.6% but less than 10% of total nucleated cells. While its presentations and findings are similar to solitary plasmacytoma, solitary plasmacytoma with minimal bone marrow involvement is more likely to progress, i.e. it recurs or becomes overt multiple myeloma in 20% to 60% of cases within 3 years. Solitary plasmacytomas associated with 10% or more plasma cells are diagnosed as overt multiple myeloma.

==== Non-secretory multiple myeloma ====
Non-secretory multiple myeloma represents a class of plasma cell dyscrasias where no myeloma protein is detected in serum or urine of patients with evidence of increased clonal bone marrow plasma cells and/or multiple plasmacytomas, particularly of the bone but also of soft tissues. While a pre-malignant phase is likely, most new cases of non-secretory multiple myeloma are brought to attention not because of incidental M protein detection which by definition is absent but because of patient symptoms indicative of malignancy possibly of plasma cell origin. The condition has been diagnosed based on biopsy-proved clonal plasma cell tumors and/or the presence in bone marrow of plasma cells at ≥10% of nucleated cells in individuals who have evidence of end organ damage attributable to an underlying plasma cell disorder. These patients typically also show one or more CRAB signs and lack evidence of a myeloma protein as measured by protein electrophoresis and immunofixation. However, more sensitive methods of detecting urinary and serum light chain myeloma proteins using enzyme-linked immunosorbent assays indicate that >60% of cases initially diagnosed as non-secretory multiple myeloma had abnormal levels of either a clonal κ or λ light chain in their urine or serum and therefore were better diagnosed as having light chain multiple myeloma. Based on the latter definition, non-secretory multiple myeloma represents ~1% of all multiple myeloma cases with formerly diagnosed non-secretory myelomas considered to be cases primarily of light chain multiple myeloma but on occasion "false non-secretors", i.e. cases in which there is evidence of myeloma protein secretion such as renal myeloma protein deposits.

A Mayo Clinic study of 124 patients initially diagnosed as having non-secretory multiple myeloma were later found to be composed of 65% free light chain secretors and 35% true non-secretors. As a group, these patients response to therapy, time to disease recurrence, and overall survival were similar to typical myeloma patients. However, in a subset of patients diagnosed after 2001 and therefore treated with more effective therapy that included autologous stem-cell transplantation, prognosis was significantly better in non-secretory multiple myeloma patients (median survival 8.3 years) compared to typical myeloma patients (median survival 5.4 years). In addition, non-secretory patients exhibited a better prognosis than light chain-secretory patients.

==== Plasma Cell Myeloma with concomitant chronic Lymphocytic Leukemia/monoclonal B-Cell Lymphocytosis ====
Multiple myeloma occurring concurrently with chronic Lymphocytic Leukemia or its pre-malignant precursor, monoclonal B-cell lymphocytosis, is an extremely rare condition in which patients evidence findings of the plasma cell dyscrasia plus either one of the cited clonal lymphocytic diseases. Patients are typically elderly (median age of 74, range 42–91 years old) males (51 of 66 case reports) and commonly present with a combination of symptoms related to chronic lymphocytic leukemia symptoms (fatigue, autoimmune hemolytic anemia, enlargements of liver and/or spleen and lymphadenopathy) plus symptoms of multiple myelomas. Patients exhibit two distinct populations of clonal cells in their bone marrow, blood, and/or other tissues: plasma cells, which may have an immature plasmablastic morphology and small lymphocytes, which have a morphology typical of chronic lymphocytic leukemia cells. Patients blood and/or urine evidences a plasma cell-derived myeloma proteins, either IgG, IgA, or free light chain in ~50%, 20%, and 20% of cases, respectively, but may also have a second myeloma protein made by the lymphocytic cells, either an IgM or IgG. Signs and symptoms of chronic lymphocytic leukemia commonly precede those of multiple myeloma, sometimes by years. The relationship between the two clones of cells in this combined disease has not been established although one study suggests that the clonal plasma cells and clonal lymphocytes arise from a common hematological stem cell. In general, patients with plasma cell myeloma with concomitant chronic Lymphocytic Leukemia/monoclonal B-cell Lymphocytosis have been treated with the same regimens used for multiple myeloma patients unless significant complications related to the lymphocytic component of their disease (e.g. autoimmune hemolytic anemia) require treatments used in chronic lymphocytic leukemia. Some patients who lack appreciable symptoms have been followed with no specific treatment of their disease.

==== Waldenström macroglobulinemia ====
According to the International Workshop on Waldenström's Macroglobulinemia, the disease is diagnosed in patients that have a serum IgM monoclonal protein and a bone marrow that contains ≥10% of its nucleated cells as lymphoplasmacytic cells. There is no requirement for symptomatic disease, a particular level of IgM protein, or presence of extramedullary (i.e. non-bone) lymphoplasmacytic cell infiltrates. The overall survival for this malignancy at 5 and 10 years among >5,000 patients is 62% and 39%, respectively, with newer treatment regimens anticipated to improve these survival rates in the future.

==== Multiple myeloma ====
Multiple myeloma is diagnosed in patients that (except for non-secretory multiple myeloma patients) have a clonal IgG, IgA, IgD, or IgE myeloma protein in their serum and/or a clonal κ or λ light chain in their serum or urine plus either one of two sets of criteria. In the first criteria set, patients must have ≥10% bone marrow clonal plasma cells plus ≥1 of the CRAB criteria; in the second criteria set, patients must have ≥10 bone marrow clonal plasma cells plus ≥1 of the following findings, ≥60% bone marrow clonal plasma cells, a free κ/λ or λ/κ light chain ratio in serum of ≥100 (the involved clonal light chain concentration must be ≥100 milligrams/liter), and/or >1 focal bone lesion on magnetic resonance imaging. The 5 year medium survival of patients with multiple myeloma treated with currently used treatment regiments is 48.5%.

==== Light chain multiple myeloma ====
Light chain multiple myeloma is diagnosed in patients who have: a) the criteria for diagnosis of multiple myeloma except having a serum free light chain ratio outside the normal range of 0.26 to 1.65 without evidence of an intact immunoglobulin or free heavy chain; or b) an extreme free light chain ratio, i.e. outside the range of 0.02 to 100 (with the light chain having the lower concentration being present at >10 milligrams/liter) regardless of the stage of their plasma cell dyscrasia. At the time of diagnosis, 30% to 50% of light chain multiple myeloma patients have severe renal dysfunction or kidney failure due to light chain myeloma cast nephropathy or the nephrotoxic effects of free light chains on renal tubular cells. Patients are treated similarly to patients suffering the counterparts those with multiple myeloma except that the focus is treating or preventing kidney damage using chemotherapy to reduce production of the monoclonal light chain and thereby stopping, reversing, or preventing kidney injury.

==== Plasma cell leukemia ====
Plasma cell leukemia is a form of multiple myeloma in which significant numbers of typically immature appearing plasma cells, i.e. plasmablasts, circulate in the blood. Very small numbers of plasma cells may reach the circulation in non-IgM multiple myeloma, non-IgM SMM, and, exceptionally, non-IgM MGUS. In these plasma cell dyscrasias, the presence of even very small numbers of circulating plasma cells is a poor prognostic indicator. In plasma cell leukemia, however, circulating plasma cells reach far higher numbers and at these circulating levels are associated with exceptionally poor survival rates. The International Myeloma Working Group has defined the diagnostic criteria for plasma cell leukemia as the presence in blood of >2 billion plasma cells per liter or, alternatively, >20% of nucleated blood cells being plasma cells. More recently, the Group has suggested that values of 0.5 billion or 5%, respectively, may be more appropriate from a therapeutic viewpoint and therefore should be studied as a definitive criterion for the disease. A recent study supported this suggestion in finding that multiple myeloma patients with >5% circulating plasma cells had a prognosis much worse than that for multiple myeloma and similar to that for plasma cell leukemia. Flow cytometry immunophenotyping of blood cells to detect clonal phenotypes of plasma cells seen in multiple myeloma (e.g. the CD138^{+}, CD38^{+}, CD19^{−}, CD4^{+/-} phenotype) may be a more sensitive method to enumerate circulating clonal plasma cells and diagnose plasma cell leukemia.

There are two forms of plasma cell leukemia: Primary plasma cell leukemia in which patients without a history of multiple myeloma present with diagnostically high levels of circulating plasma cells and Secondary plasma cell leukemia in which patients with multiple myeloma suffer their dyscrasia's progression by the expansion of large numbers of their malignant plasma cells into the circulation and distant tissues. Historically, primary plasma cell leukemia was more common than the secondary form but with the increased survival of multiple myeloma patients due to new treatment regiments, more cases of secondary plasma cell leukemia are occurring; currently, the two forms occur in approximately equal numbers. Patients with primary plasma cell leukemia present with clinical findings that are less commonly found in multiple myeloma, e.g. they often have hepatomegaly, splenomegaly, lymphadenopathy, nerve and central nervous system defects, bleeding tendencies secondary to thrombocytopenia, and pleural effusions. They are less likely than multiple myeloma patients to have lytic bone lesions. In several studies of patients with either form of plasma cell leukemia, the disease was associated with clonal IgG in 28% to 56% of cases, IgA in 4% to 7% of cases, and a light chain in 23% to 44% of cases; 0-12% of patients had no myeloma protein. Medium survival for primary and secondary plasma cell dyscrasias have been 7–13 months and 2–7 months, respectively, but appear to be improving with new treatment regimens.

== Heavy chain disease ==
The four heavy chain diseases are exceedingly rare conditions associated with the production, circulation in blood, and often presence in urine of a free clonal heavy chain with no detected clonal light chains. The heavy chain is non-functional and altered by having deletions, insertions, and point mutations due to somatic mutations in their respective coding genes. Beyond this commonality, however, these diseases have very different clinical differences. Furthermore, each of the heavy chain diseases appears to be due to rare variants of lymphoma and therefore is sometimes regarded as a B cell dyscrasia. However, heavy chain diseases are still often classified with plasma cell dyscrasias. The heavy chain diseases are classified as α, γ, and μ heavy chain diseases and are based respectively on >400, 130, and 30–40 case reports as reviewed in a 2014 publication.

=== α Heavy chain disease ===
α Heavy chain disease (also termed immunoproliferative small intestinal disease or IPSID, Mediterranean lymphoma, and Seligmann disease) afflicts primarily individuals of Mediterranean, North African, and Middle Eastern descent of lower economic status. Many cases are centered in the Middle East and associated with relatively unsanitary living conditions. The disease usually appears between the ages 10 and 30 and in some cases may be an aberrant immune response to a parasite or other microorganism. The disease commonly affects the gastrointestinal tract leading to signs and symptoms of a malabsorption syndrome or, far less commonly, the respiratory tract with signs and symptoms of respiratory dysfunction. Involved tissues usually include mucosa-associated lymphoid tissues and evidence a histology of lymphoplasmacytoid infiltrates accompanied by large numbers of plasma cells and small lymphocytes. The plasma cells therein express the monoclonal α chain and therefore are clonal in nature and the sole or contributing producer of the α chain myeloma protein. Some 57% to 66% of patients present with disseminated lymphoma, 17% to 36% of patients present with a localized lymphoma, and 9% to 17% of patients lack any evidence of a lymphoplasmacytic neoplasm. A majority of the latter patients have an autoimmune disease or a chronic infection which may be responsible for, or contribute to, production of the α heavy chain. Studies indicated that a sub-set particularly of the digestive form of heavy chain disease is caused by infection. This is based on findings that the majority of α heavy chain disease patients are in the lower economic class living under unsanitary conditions, that gastrointestinal bacterial and parasitic infections have been documented in many of these patients, and that long-term (>6 months) appropriately selected antibiotic therapy has improved the condition in 33% to 71% of patients who are at an early stage of the disease and documented to be infected. However, these patients frequently relapse. Patients resistant to antibiotic trials have been treated with multiple drug chemotherapy to obtain complete remission rates of 64% and an overall 5 year survival of 67%.

=== γ heavy chain disease ===
γ Heavy chain disease (also termed Franklin disease or Franklin's disease) presents in three patterns: a) aggressive lymphoma (57% to 66% of cases) associated with constitutional symptoms and in 50% of cases with enlargement of lymph nodes, spleen, and/or liver; b) localized lymphoma (~25% of cases) with lymphoma limited to the bone marrow or an extra-nodal site, usually the skin but sometimes the thyroid gland, parotid gland, oropharyngeal cavity, conjunctiva, or gastrointestinal tract; and c) no lymphoma (9% to 17% of cases) associated typically with a preexistent autoimmune disease but no evidence of lymphoma. Involved lymphoma-infiltrated tissues typically show a mixture of lymphoplamsmacytoid cells, plasma cells, lymphocytes, and sometimes variable numbers of eosinophils and histiocytes. Treatment of the disease varies with its clinical severity. Patients with aggressive lymphoma have been treated with multiple drug chemotherapy, patients with limited lymphoma have been monitored for disease progression or treated locally (e.g. radiation therapy, surgical removal), and patients with no lymphoma have been monitored for progression in their diseases while being treated for any autoimmune disease that they bear. Spontaneous remissions in γ heavy chain disease have occurred. Regardless of presentation pattern, these patients may have an aggressive or indolent disease with courses ranging from the asymptomatic presence of a stable monoclonal heavy chain in the serum or urine (e.g. MGUS) to a rapid, downhill progression of a few weeks' duration. γ Heavy chain disease survivorship ranged form 1 month to >20 years (medium survival 7.4 years) in a Mayo Clinic study.

=== μ Heavy chain disease ===
μ Heavy chain disease presents with a picture of a lymphoid neoplasm resembling either chronic lymphocytic leukemia or small lymphocytic lymphoma. This picture includes splenomegaly in virtually all cases, hepatomegaly in ~75% of cases, lymphadenopathy in ~40% of cases, and lytic bone lesions in ~20% of cases. Patients often have hypogammaglobulinemia, increases in urinary free light chains, and a bone marrow containing vacuolated plasma cells or lymphoid cells. Treatment of μ heavy chain disease had varied form observation only in asymptomatic patients to single drug or and multiple drug chemotherapy in symptomatic patients. Survival with this disease varies between <1 month to >10 years with a median survival rate of ~2 years.

== See also ==
- Gammaglobulins
- Paraproteinemia
