= Plasmacytoma =

Growth of a plasma cell tumour within soft tissue or the axial skeleton

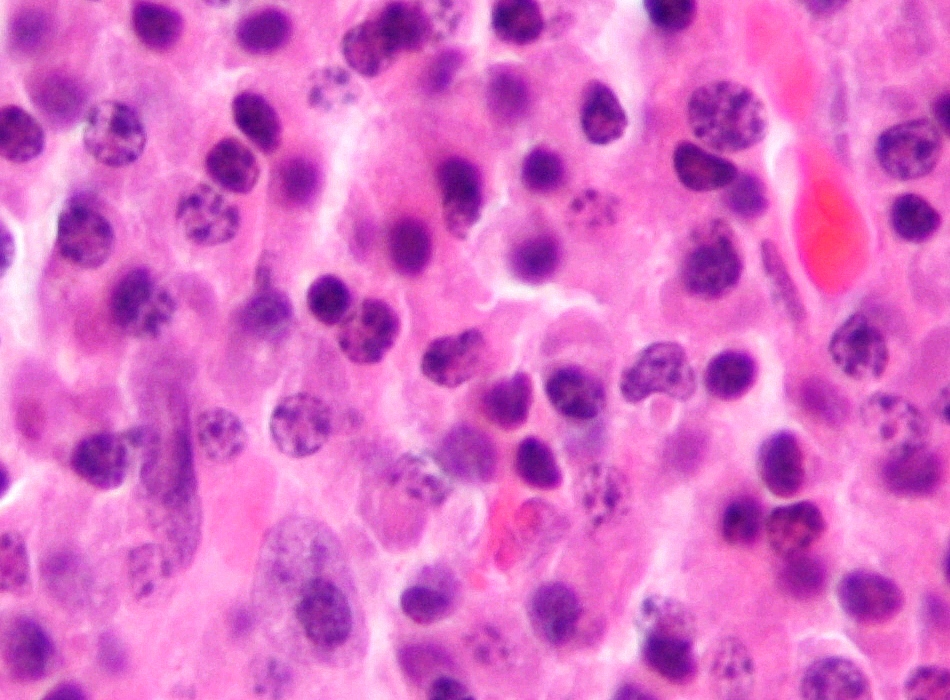
- Micrograph of a plasmacytoma. H&E stain.
- Specialty: Hematology and oncology

Plasmacytoma is a plasma cell dyscrasia in which a plasma cell tumour grows within soft tissue or within the axial skeleton.

The International Myeloma Working Group lists three types: solitary plasmacytoma of bone (SPB); extramedullary plasmacytoma (EP), and multiple plasmacytomas that are either primary or recurrent. The most common of these is SPB, accounting for 3–5% of all plasma cell malignancies. SPBs occur as lytic lesions within the axial skeleton and extramedullary plasmacytomas most often occur in the upper respiratory tract (85%), but can occur in any soft tissue. Approximately half of all cases produce paraproteinemia. SPBs and extramedullary plasmacytomas are mostly treated with radiotherapy, but surgery is used in some cases of extramedullary plasmacytoma. The skeletal forms frequently progress to multiple myeloma over the course of 2–4 years.

Due to their cellular similarity, plasmacytomas have to be differentiated from multiple myeloma. For SPB and extramedullary plasmacytoma the distinction is the presence of only one lesion (either in bone or soft tissue), normal bone marrow (<5% plasma cells), normal skeletal survey, absent or low paraprotein and no end organ damage.

== Pathophysiology ==
While the cause is generally unknown, potential triggers for extramedullary plasmacytoma (EMP) include chronic stimulation, inhalation of chemicals, viral infections and irradiation. Interleukin-6 (IL-6) is considered as the principal growth factor. Cytogenetic abnormalities include loss of chromosome 13, 1p and 14q and gains in 19, 1q and 9q. Inflammation or trauma increases the expression of stromal cell-derived factor 1(SDF-1), which attracts plasma cells expressing CXCR-4 chemokine receptors to those sites. Which leads to proliferation of plasma cells and finally tumor formation.

== Signs and symptoms ==
For SPB the most common presenting symptom is that of pain in the affected bone. Back pain and other consequences of the bone lesion may occur such as spinal cord compression or pathological fracture. Around 85% of extramedullary plasmacytoma presents within the upper respiratory tract mucosa, causing possible symptoms such as epistaxis, rhinorrhoea and nasal obstruction. In some tissues it may be found as a palpable mass. Tumor at skull base having presenting symptoms of headache, diplopia (double vision), strabismus, otalgia (ear pain) and dizziness. Rare gastrointestinal involvement may present with epigastric pain, bleeding, loss of appetite and rare mesenteric involvement. Hoarseness of voice and airway obstruction suggest laryngeal involvement.

== Diagnosis ==
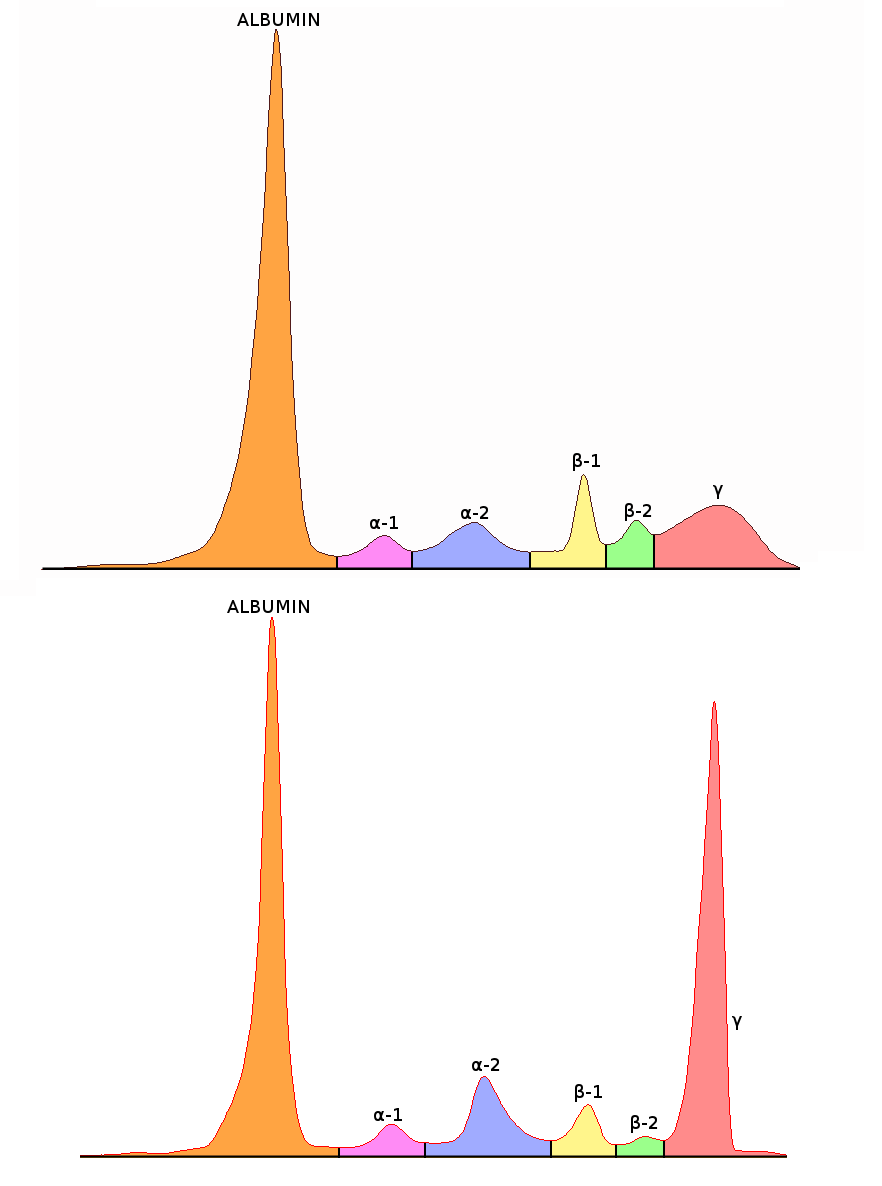
Serum protein electrophoresis of an individual with polyclonal antibodies (top) and an individual with a large paraprotein (bottom).

The diagnosis of plasmacytoma uses a diverse range of interdisciplinary techniques including serum protein electrophoresis, bone marrow biopsy, urine analysis for Bence Jones protein and complete blood count, plain film radiography, MRI and PET-CT.

Serum protein electrophoresis separates the proteins in the liquid part of the blood (serum), allowing the analysis of antibodies. Normal blood serum contains a range of antibodies and are said to be polyclonal, whereas serum from a person with plasmacytoma may show a monoclonal spike. This is due to an outgrowth of a single type of plasma cell that forms the plasmacytoma and produces a single type of antibody. The plasma cells are said to be monoclonal and the excessively produced antibody is known as monoclonal protein or paraprotein. Paraproteins are present in 60% of SPB and less than 25% of extramedullary plasmacytoma.

Bone marrow biopsies are performed to ensure the disease is localised; and in SPB or extramedullary plasmacytoma there will not be an increase of monoclonal plasma cells. Tissue biopsies of SPB and extramedullary plasmacytoma are used to assess the phenotype of the plasma cells. Histological analyses can be performed on these biopsies to see what cluster of differentiation (CD) markers are present and to assess monoclonality of the cells. CD markers can aid in the distinction of extramedullary plasmacytoma from lymphomas. CD38 and CD138 are useful markers for immunohistochemical evaluation.

Skeletal surveys are used to ensure there are no other primary tumors within the axial skeleton. MRI can be used to assess tumor status and may be advantageous in detecting primary tumors that are not detected by plain film radiography. PET-CT may also be beneficial in detecting extramedullary tumours in individuals diagnosed with SPB. CT imaging may be better than plain film radiography for assessing bone damage.

An important distinction to be made is that a true plasmacytoma is present and not a systemic plasma cell disorder, such as multiple myeloma. The difference between plasmacytoma and multiple myeloma is that plasmacytoma lacks increased blood calcium, decreased kidney function, too few red blood cells in the bloodstream, and multiple bone lesions (collectively termed CRAB).

=== Classification ===
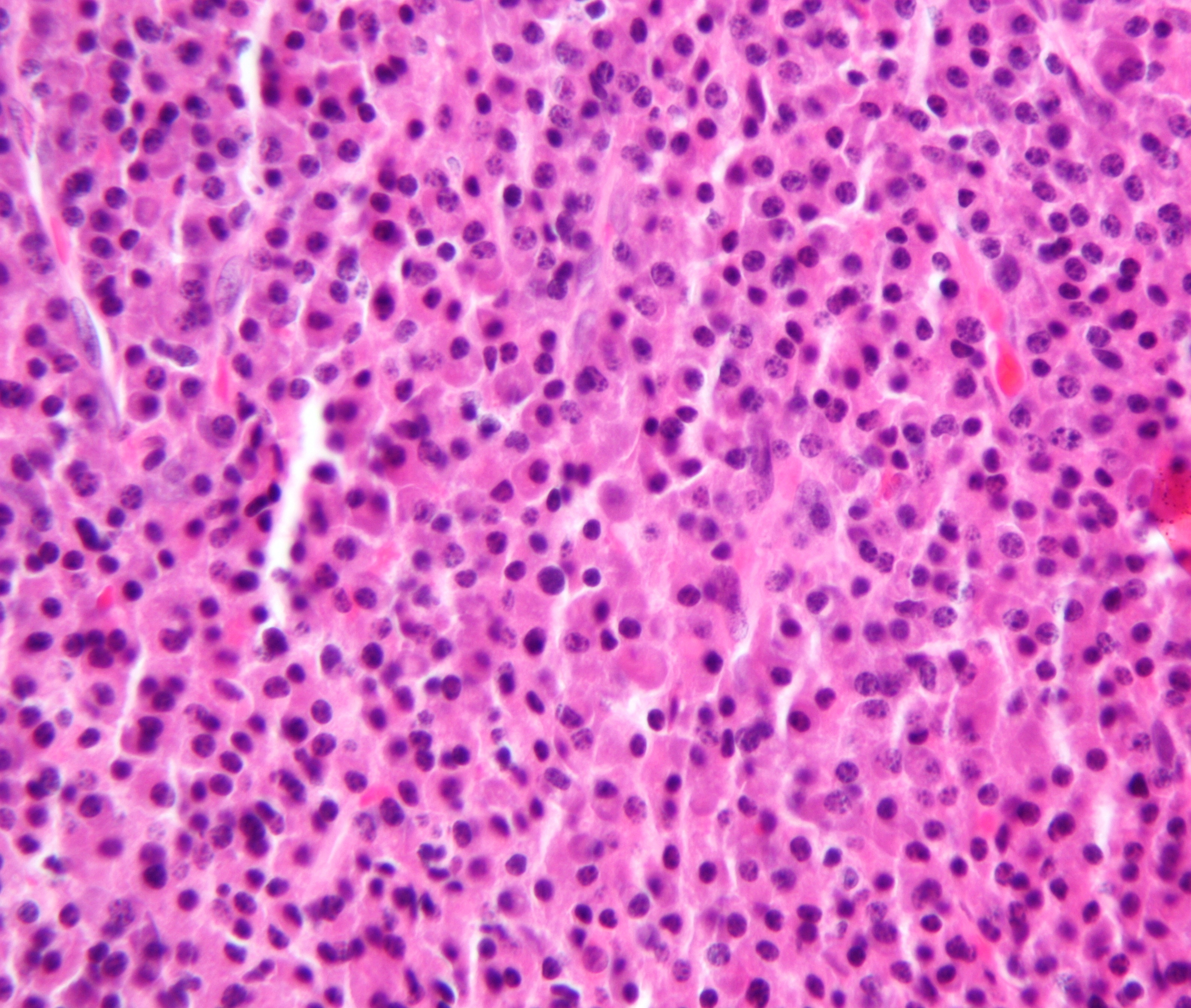
Micrograph of a plasmacytoma.

Plasmacytoma is a tumor of plasma cells. The cells are identical to those seen in multiple myeloma, but they form discrete masses of cells in the skeleton (solitary plasmacytoma of bone; SPB) or in soft tissues (extramedullary plasmacytoma; EP). They do not present with systemic disease, which would classify them as another systemic plasma cell disorder.

The International Myeloma Working Group (IMWG) has published criteria for the diagnosis of plasmacytomas. They recognise three distinct entities: SPB, extramedullary plasmacytoma and multiple solitary plasmacytomas (+/- recurrent). The proposed criteria for SPB is the presence of a single bone lesion, normal bone marrow (less than 5% plasma cells), small or no paraprotein, no related organ involvement/damage and a normal skeletal survey (other than the single bone lesion). The criteria for extramedullary plasmacytoma are the same but the tumor is located in soft tissue. No bone lesions should be present. Criteria for multiple solitary plasmacytomas (+/- recurrent) are the same except either multiple solitary bone or soft tissue lesions must be present. They may occur as multiple primary tumors or as a recurrence from a previous plasmacytoma.

According to the World Health Organization (WHO) update, SPB is further divided into two subtypes:

SPB with minimal bone marrow involvement: Defined as having less than 10% clonal marrow cells, this type has a 20–60% progression rate to Multiple Myeloma (MM) within three years.

SPB with no bone marrow involvement: Lacks clonal marrow cells and has a lower progression rate of 10% in three years.

=== Association with the Epstein–Barr virus ===
Rarely, the Epstein–Barr virus (EBV) is associated with multiple myeloma and plasmacytomas, particularly in individuals who have an immunodeficiency due to e.g. HIV/AIDS, organ transplantation, or a chronic inflammatory condition such as rheumatoid arthritis. EBV-positive multiple myeloma and plasmacytoma are classified together by the World Health Organization (2016) as Epstein–Barr virus-associated lymphoproliferative diseases and termed Epstein–Barr virus-associated plasma cell myeloma. EBV-positivity is more common in plasmacytoma than multiple myeloma. The tissues involved in EBV+ plasmacytoma typically show foci of EBV+ cells with the appearance of rapidly proliferating immature or poorly differentiated plasma cells. These cells express products of EBV genes such as EBER1 and EBER2. EBV-positive plasmacytoma(s) is more likely to progress to multiple myeloma than EBV-negative plasmacytoma(s) suggesting that the virus may play a role in the progression of plasmacytoma to multiple myeloma.

== Staging ==
Three-stage system for soft tissue plasmacytoma.

Stage 1: Absence of lymph node metastasis and tumor size under 5 cm.

Stage 2: Presence of either lymph node metastasis or a tumor size over 5 cm.

Stage 3: Presence of both factors.

== Differential Diagnosis ==
Immunohistochemistry of kappa (κ, left) and lambda (λ, right) immunoglobulin light chains in normal tonsil control tissue, with an approximate κ:λ ratio of 2:1 in the displayed fields, which is normal. An abnormal predominance of one light chain (light-chain restriction) can support a clonal B-cell or plasma-cell proliferation, including plasmacytoma.

Non-Hodgkin Lymphoma (NHL) with plasmacytic differentiation mimics plasmacytoma morphologically. This can be differentiated by the expression of CD19 and CD45 in lymphoma cells. Reactive Plasmacytosis characterized by follicular hyperplasia and a lack of light chain restriction. Plasmablastic Lymphoma often associated with HIV or the Epstein-Barr virus in the oral cavity. The aggressive clinical progression is driven a TP53 mutation coupled along with hyperactivation of the JAK/STAT, MAPK/ERK and NOTCH signaling cascades.

== Treatment ==
Radiotherapy is the main choice of treatment for both SPB and extramedullary plasmacytoma, and local control rates of >80% can be achieved. This form of treatment can be used with curative intent because plasmacytoma is a radiosensitive tumor. A fractionated dose of 40–50 Gy over four weeks (1.8 to 2.0 Gy per fraction) is recommended. The radiation field should include the tumor plus a 1.5 to 2.0 cm margin. Chemotherapy does not decrease the incidence of progression of plasmacytoma to multiple myeloma (MM), but it does increase the duration of progression to MM. Adjuvant chemotherapy should be considered for tumors larger than 5 cm or those unresponsive to radiation. Autologous Stem Cell Transplantation (ASCT) is indicated for high-risk, recurrent or multiple solitary cases. Surgery is an option for extramedullary plasmacytoma, but for cosmetic reasons it is generally used when the lesion is not present within the head and neck region. Another option is the possible combination of radiotherapy with anti-multiple myeloma treatment. In a study that included 68 patients, a group of 8 patients who were treated with radio- and chemotherapy (with or without surgery) were less likey to have a relapse of plasmacytoma, progress to multiple myeloma, or die compared with patients who were treated with radiotherapy and/or surgery alone [progression free survival (PFS), overall median: not reached vs. 48.0 months; respectively]. Concerning that study, a large prospective trial is needed to evaluate the impact of adding systemic anti-myeloma treatment to local radiotherapy.

== Prognosis ==
Most cases of SPB progress to multiple myeloma within 2–4 years of diagnosis, but the overall median survival for SPB is 7–12 years. 30–50% of extramedullary plasmacytoma cases progress to multiple myeloma with a median time of 1.5–2.5 years. 15–45% of SPB and 50–65% of extramedullary plasmacytoma are disease free after 10 years. Age over 40 years, tumors 5 cm or larger, spine lesions, neurologic symptoms and the persistence of M-proteins after treatment are poor prognostic factors for SPB.

== Complications ==
POEMS (polyneuropathy, organomegaly, endocrinopathy, multiple myeloma and skin changes) is a paraneoplastic disorder associated with plasmacytoma. Rarely, acquired Von Willebrand syndrome, Cryoglobulinemia (especially if Hepatitis C is present), Amyloidosis and Renal impairment are also reported with plasmacytoma.

== Postoperative follow up ==
Lifelong follow-up is required, starting at six-week intervals for the first six months. The NCCN recommends yearly imaging for five years using the same technique used for the initial diagnosis.

== Epidemiology ==
Plasmacytomas are a rare form of cancer. SPB is the most common form of the disease and accounts for 3-5% of all plasma cell malignancies. The median age at diagnosis for all plasmacytomas is 55. Both SPB and extramedullary plasmacytoma are more prevalent in males; with a 2:1 male to female ratio for SPB and a 3:1 ratio for extramedullary plasmacytoma.

== Terminology ==
There can be some ambiguity when using the word. "Plasmacytoma" is sometimes equated with "plasma cell dyscrasia" or "solitary myeloma". It is often used as part of the phrase "solitary plasmacytoma". or as part of the phrase "extramedullary plasmacytoma". In this context, "extramedullary" means outside of the bone marrow.

== See also ==
- Plasma cell dyscrasia
- Multiple myeloma
- Monoclonal gammopathy of undetermined significance (MGUS)
- Waldenström's macroglobulinemia
- Cutaneous B-cell lymphoma
