= Smouldering myeloma =

- Other names: Smoldering myeloma, smoldering multiple myeloma, indolent myeloma or asymptomatic myeloma
- Specialty: Hematology/oncology

Smouldering myeloma is a symptomless, pre-malignant disorder of plasma cells, a type of white blood cell that normally produces antibodies. It belongs to a wider family of progressive plasma cell disorders known as plasma cell dyscrasias. There is a risk of eventual progression to multiple myeloma, a malignant hematological disease.

At the milder end of the spectrum of plasma cell dyscrasias, a clone of plasma cells may secrete abnormal amounts of myeloma protein into the blood to cause the relatively benign disorder of monoclonal gammopathy of undetermined significance. When this clone proliferates it may slowly evolve into the more aggressive sub-clones that cause smouldering multiple myeloma. Further and more rapid evolution can then cause the overtly malignant stage of multiple myeloma and subsequently lead to the extremely malignant stage of secondary plasma cell leukemia. Thus, some patients with smouldering myeloma progress to multiple myeloma and plasma cell leukemia. Smouldering myeloma, however, is not itself a malignant disease. It is characterised as a pre-malignant disorder that lacks symptoms but is associated with bone marrow biopsy showing the presence of an abnormal number of clonal myeloma cells, blood and urine containing a myeloma protein, and a significant risk of developing into a malignant disease.

== Diagnosis ==
Smouldering myeloma is characterised by:

- Serum paraprotein >30 g/L or urinary monoclonal protein ≥500 mg per 24 h AND/OR
- Clonal plasma cells >10% and <60% on bone marrow biopsy AND
- No evidence of end organ damage that can be attributed to plasma cell disorder AND
- No myeloma-defining event (>60% plasma cells in bone marrow OR involved/uninvolved light chain ratio>100)

== Treatment ==
Treatment for multiple myeloma is focused on therapies that decrease the clonal plasma cell population and consequently decrease the signs and symptoms of disease. If the disease is completely asymptomatic (i.e. there is a paraprotein and an abnormal bone marrow population but no end-organ damage), as in smouldering myeloma, treatment is typically deferred, or restricted to clinical trials.

They are generally responsive to IL-1β neutralisation.

Treatment for smoldering multiple myeloma (SMM) has changed significantly in the recent years. The current treatment of SMM depends on whether or not the patient has high or low risk SMM.

The method to distinguish between high risk and low risk patients come from the MAYO 2008, PETHEMA, and SWOG models. The PETHEMA group characterizes between risk categories using immunoparesis and aberrant plasma cell percentages with high risk patients exhibiting short time to progression towards symptomatic multiple myeloma. The MAYO 2008 model also incorporates parameters such as bone marrow and plasma cell percentage, M-protein levels, and sFLC ratios.

In 2019, the 20/2/20 model emerged from the International Myeloma Foundation (IMF). This model states that if all three of the following are true: the percentage of plasma cells in the bone marrow is 20% or more, M-Protein level is 2g/dL or greater, or the sFLC ratio is greater than 20, then the patient is classified as high risk.

Patients classified as low risk SMM are cared for by being given active surveillance. Doctors would closely monitor the serum M protein, serum free light chain (FLC) levels, complete blood count, serum calcium, and serum creatinine of the patient every 3 to 4 months for 5 years. If any changes indicative of disease progression is detected, then the patient would be classified as a high risk and will be diagnosed as such. If the patient does not show any signs of change, additional visits after the initial 5 years will separated by 6 months instead.

High risk patients require early intervention to prevent or delay the progression towards symptomatic multiple myeloma and other complications. Lenalidomide or lenalidomide plus dexamethasone (Rd) is a common treatment for high risk SMM. Many clinical trials have shown that a lenalidomide based therapy can significantly lengthen the time before the patient progresses to symptomatic multiple myeloma. The duration and intensity of lenalidomide based therapy may vary based on factors of the patient as well as the response to the treatment. Other treatments include bisphosphonates or monoclonal antibodies. These may be used in selecting high risk patients, specifically, bisphosphonates may be used to reduce the risk of skeletal related events in high risk patients with osteopenia or osteoporosis.

The purpose of using lenalidomide based therapy instead of myeloma like therapy for high risk SMM is based on randomized trials that ultimately show that lenalidomide based therapy has a clear increase in survival rate. The reason as to not immediately go straight to myeloma like therapy is due to the high amount of regulation required. Tests must be made to check if using a certain drug is actually beneficial to the patient before it may be administered, however lenalidomide based therapy can be administered regularly.

== Risk of progression ==
Smouldering myeloma is associated with a cumulative risk of progression to myeloma or amyloidosis of 21.6% within 3 years.
