= Monoclonal gammopathy of undetermined significance =

- Other names: Benign monoclonal gammopathy, monoclonal gammopathy of unknown significance, monoclonal gammopathy of renal significance, unknown or uncertain may be substituted for undetermined
- Schematic representation of a normal protein electrophoresis gel. A small spike would be present in the gamma (γ) band in MGUS

Monoclonal gammopathy of undetermined significance (MGUS) is a plasma cell dyscrasia in which plasma cells or other types of antibody-producing cells secrete a myeloma protein, i.e. an abnormal antibody, into the blood; this abnormal protein is usually found during standard laboratory blood or urine tests. It is a type of monoclonal gammopathy. MGUS resembles multiple myeloma and similar diseases, but the levels of antibodies are lower, the number of plasma cells (white blood cells that secrete antibodies) in the bone marrow is lower, and it rarely has symptoms or major problems. However, since MGUS can progress to multiple myeloma, with a rate ranging from 0.5% to 1.5% per year depending on the risk category, yearly monitoring is recommended.

The progression from MGUS to multiple myeloma usually involves several steps. In rare cases, it may also be related with a slowly progressive symmetric distal sensorimotor neuropathy.

== Signs and symptoms ==
People with monoclonal gammopathy generally do not experience signs or symptoms. Some people may experience a rash or nerve problems, such as numbness or tingling. MGUS is usually detected by chance when the patient has a blood test for another condition or as part of standard screening.

== Pathophysiology ==
Pathologically, the lesion in MGUS is in fact very similar to that in multiple myeloma. There is a predominance of clonal plasma cells in the bone marrow with an abnormal immunophenotype (CD38+ CD56+ CD19−) mixed in with cells of a normal phenotype (CD38+ CD56− CD19+); in MGUS, on average more than 3% of the clonal plasma cells have the normal phenotype, whereas in multiple myeloma, less than 3% of the cells have the normal phenotype.

== Diagnosis ==
MGUS is a common, age-related medical condition characterized by an accumulation of bone marrow plasma cells derived from a single abnormal clone. Patients may be diagnosed with MGUS if they fulfill the following four criteria:

1. A monoclonal paraprotein band less than 30 g/L (< 3g/dL);
2. Plasma cells less than 10% on bone marrow examination;
3. No evidence of bone lesions, anemia, hypercalcemia, or chronic kidney disease related to the paraprotein, and
4. No evidence of another B-cell proliferative disorder.

=== Differential diagnosis ===
Several other illnesses can present with a monoclonal gammopathy, and the monoclonal protein may be the first discovery before a formal diagnosis is made:

- Multiple myeloma
- Smouldering multiple myeloma
- Waldenström macroglobulinemia
- Chronic lymphocytic leukemia
- Non-Hodgkin lymphoma, particularly Splenic marginal zone lymphoma and Lymphoplasmocytic lymphoma
- Connective tissue disease such as lupus
- Immunosuppression following organ transplantation
- Guillain–Barré syndrome
- Tempi syndrome
- POEMS
- Hepatitis C
- AIDS

== Management ==
MGUS occurs in over 3 percent of the White population over the age of 50, and is typically detected as an incidental finding when patients undergo a protein electrophoresis as part of an evaluation for a wide variety of clinical symptoms and disorders (e.g., peripheral neuropathy, vasculitis, hemolytic anemia, skin rashes, hypercalcemia, or elevated erythrocyte sedimentation rate). Although patients with MGUS have sometimes been reported to have peripheral neuropathy, a debilitating condition which causes bizarre sensory problems to painful sensory problems, no treatment is indicated.

The protein electrophoresis test should be repeated annually, and if there is any concern for a rise in the level of monoclonal protein, then prompt referral to a hematologist is required. The hematologist, when first evaluating a case of MGUS, will usually perform a skeletal survey (X-rays of the proximal skeleton), check the blood for hypercalcemia and deterioration in renal function, check the urine for Bence Jones protein and perform a bone marrow biopsy. If none of these tests are abnormal, a patient with MGUS is followed up once every 6 months to a year with a blood test (serum protein electrophoresis).

== Prognosis ==
At the Mayo Clinic, MGUS transformed into multiple myeloma or similar lymphoproliferative disorders at the rate of about 0.5–2% a year depending on risk category. However, because they were elderly, most patients with MGUS died of something else and did not go on to develop multiple myeloma. When this was taken into account, only 11.2% developed lymphoproliferative disorders.

Kyle et al. studied the prevalence of myeloma in the population as a whole (not clinic patients) in Olmsted County, Minnesota. They found that the prevalence of MGUS was 3.2% in people above 50, with a slight male predominance (4.0% vs. 2.7%). Prevalence increased with age: of people over 70 up to 5.3% had MGUS, while in the over-85 age group the prevalence was 7.5%. In the majority of cases (63.5%), the paraprotein level was <1 g/dL, while only a very small group had levels over 2 g/dL.

A study of monoclonal protein levels conducted in Ghana showed a prevalence of MGUS of approximately 5.9% in African men over the age of 50.

In 2009, prospective data demonstrated that all or almost all cases of multiple myeloma are preceded by MGUS.

In addition to multiple myeloma, MGUS may also progress to Waldenström's macroglobulinemia or primary amyloidosis.

== See also ==
- MGUS polyneuropathy
- Monoclonal gammopathy
- Monoclonal gammopathy of renal significance
- Plasma cell dyscrasia
