= Myeloma Foundation =

Myeloma Foundation may refer to:

- Multiple Myeloma Research Foundation
- International Myeloma Foundation
