= MGUS polyneuropathy =

Neurological disease

MGUS polyneuropathy or polyneuropathy associated with an M component is a rare neurological disease characterized by inflammation of the peripheral nervous system and monoclonal gammopathy of undetermined significance (MGUS). It was first described in the 1960s. The main symptoms are progressive muscle weakness that is symmetrical and bilateral, ataxia, numbness and arm tremor. Treatments include intravenous immunoglobulin, which is a short-term treatment, immunosuppressants, though they have not been shown to be effective, autologous stem cell transplantation, and rituximab.
