= Brian Durie =

Scottish hematologist

Brian G.M. Durie
- Born: 1942 (age 83–84); North Berwick, Scotland
- Died: October 12, 2025
- Occupations: Physician, researcher
- Known for: Durie-Salmon Staging System; International Myeloma Working Group; Black Swan Research Initiative
- Board member of: International Myeloma Foundation

Brian G.M. Durie is a Scottish hematologist known for his research and efforts regarding multiple myeloma and blood disorders, especially his development of the multiple myeloma staging system. He is the former chairman of the board and Scientific Director for the Myeloma Foundation and a specialist in multiple myeloma and related disorders at the Cedars-Sinai Outpatient Cancer Center at the Samuel Oschin Comprehensive Cancer Institute.

== Early life and education ==
Durie was born December 1942 in Gullane, Scotland. and graduated in 1960 from North Berwick High School. He attended the University of Edinburgh Medical School and graduated in 1966. After Medical and Surgical House Officer positions at the University of Edinburgh Royal Infirmary in 1967, he moved to the United States to complete his medical residency and subspecialty training. His training at Mayo Clinic in Minnesota was completed in 1972 and led to Specialty Board Certification in Internal Medicine (ABIM) in 1972 followed by his Certification in Hematology (ABIM) in 1974 and Oncology (ABIM) in 1975. Durie obtained his Medical licensure in Minnesota in 1972, Arizona in 1974 and California in 1993

== Faculty positions ==
Upon completing subspecialty training, Durie joined the Medical Faculty of the University of Arizona College of Medicine - Tucson in 1972 where he progressed to Full Professor status in the Section of Hematology/Oncology in 1981. He served as Head of the Hematology Section and Director of the Myeloma Program. In 1989, he became a professor and Head of the Department of Clinical and Laboratory Hematology at the University of London where he also established a myeloma program. In 1992, he returned to the United States in the Division of Hematology/Oncology at Cedars-Sinai Medical Center in Los Angeles. Upon return to the United States, he assume Directorship of the Hematological Research and Myeloma Programs for Aptium Oncology Inc. (subsequently AMyC Myeloma Consortium) also based at Cedars-Sinai Medical Center in the Comprehensive Cancer Center Division. He currently remains as a myeloma specialist physician

== Career and research ==
=== Development of A Staging System ===
Durie's key research articles have focused on classifying and staging myeloma. Durie's first faculty position at the University of Arizona was with Sydney Salmon with the assignment to develop a clinical staging system for multiple myeloma. This was based upon a new system for directly measuring the number of myeloma cells within the body, an approach which led to the publication of a seminal paper on myeloma staging in the journal Cancer in 1975, which has been cited more than 3000 times by other scientists. This publication continues to be referenced as the standard way to clinically stage multiple myeloma, named the Durie-Salmon Staging System. Durie has co-authored two updates to the staging system.

=== Myeloma research ===
Salmon and Durie authored a paper that concluded that the pretreatment labeling index provides helpful prognostic information in addition to tumor mass staging, which was patented. Furthermore, Durie showed it was possible to stratify myeloma patients based on combinations of serum beta 2 microglobulin with both albumin and age, producing significant separation of patients into low-, intermediate-, and high-risk categories. His research concluded that serum beta 2 microglobulin is the most powerful prognostic factor currently available for multiple myeloma. In 2006, Durie and team created an international uniform response criteria for multiple myeloma, which became very substantial for use by doctors and other researchers. Durie co-authored an update to the response criteria in 2016

=== The Creation of The International Myeloma Foundation: Accelerating the search for a cure ===
In 1990, Durie co-created a non-profit foundation, the International Myeloma Foundation. Formed in conjunction with Brian Novis and Susie Lavitt. Durie has continued to serve as chairman of the board and Scientific Director. The foundation has established myeloma patient support groups in the US and globally, created th p International Myeloma Working Group ] with 250 myeloma experts to conduct collaborative research and guideline development, and established the Black Swan Research Initiative to conduct treatment trials.

== Awards and distinctions ==
Durie is a Leukemia Society of America Scholar and a U.S. Hematologic Research Foundation Annual Awardee. Hr received the 2006 Robert A. Kyle Lifetime Achievement Award, which honors a physician in myeloma research. In 2009, he received the Waldenström's Award in recognition of his contributions to that field. He was awarded an Honorary Doctorate of Medicine from the Vrije Universiteit Brussel in 2019.

=== Awards ===
1991 5th Annual Hematological Research Award
2002 Nuclear Medicine First Prize Award
2006 Robert A. Kyle Lifetime Achievement Award
2009 Waldenström Award for Myeloma Research
2014 Mayo Distinguished Alumni Award
2019 Honorary Doctorate of Medicine: Free University of Brussels

== Publications ==
Durie has written over 600 research papers, sixteen book chapters, and five books.
