= Monoclonal gammopathy of renal significance =

- Specialty: Nephrology, Pathology, Hematology
- Complications: Kidney failure,
- Risk factors: Presence of a monoclonal gammopathy, age greater than 50
- Diagnostic method: Kidney biopsy, serum protein electrophoresis with immunofixation, serum free light chain assay
- Differential diagnosis: Multiple myeloma, Waldenstrom's macroglobulinemia, Non-Hodgkin lymphoma, Chronic lymphocytic leukemia
- Treatment: Clone directed therapy (anti-cancer therapy), immunomodulating medications (secondary approach), autologous stem cell transplantation, kidney transplantation,

Monoclonal gammopathy of renal significance (MGRS) are a group of kidney disorders that present with kidney damage due to nephrotoxic monoclonal immunoglobulins (M proteins) secreted by clonal plasma cells or B cells. By definition, people with MGRS do not meet criteria for multiple myeloma or other hematologic malignancies. The term MGRS was introduced in 2012 by the International Kidney and Monoclonal Gammopathy Research Group (IKMG). MGRS is associated with monoclonal gammopathy of undetermined significance (MGUS). People with MGUS have a monoclonal gammopathy (presence of monoclonal immunoglobulins) but does not meet the criteria for the clonal burden nor the presence of end organ damage seen in hematologic malignancies. In a population based study based on the NHANES III health survey; 6% of patients with MGUS were subsequently classified as having MGRS. The prevalence and incidence of MGRS in the general population or in specific populations is not known but it is more prevalent in those over the age of 50 as there is a monoclonal protein (M-protein) present in 3% of those 50 and years older and 5% of those 70 years and older (the presence of MGUS), placing those 50 and older at increased risk of MGRS.

MGRS disorders generally do not respond well to immunosuppressive treatment. MGRS disorders also have a greater than 90% rate of recurrence if the monoclonal gammopathy is not eliminated either before or immediately after a renal transplant. People with MGRS are at risk of progression to the corresponding hematologic malignancy.

== Pathophysiology ==
There are several separate conditions designated as MGRS which are associated with kidney damage (either directly or indirectly) due to monoclonal immunoglobulins (M proteins). Most kidney diseases associated with MGRS are glomerular disorders.

AL amyloidosis is an immunoglobulin light chain associated amyloidosis that involves the deposition of misfolded amyloid light chain (AL) immunoglobulins. These AL light chains are misfolded leading to the disordered deposition of amyloid multimers and fibrils in the glomeruli and blood vessels of the kidney. Other types of amyloidosis related MGRS disorders include heavy chain amyloidosis (deposition of only heavy amyloid chains in the kidney)(AH) and heavy and light chain amyloidosis (AHL)(deposition of heavy and light chains). Amyloidosis is the most common form of MGRS, with the AL subtype being the most common type. Extra-renal manifestations, such as heart failure, gastrointestinal symptoms, secondary neuropathy (carpal tunnel syndrome), liver involvement and peripheral neuropathy are very common with amyloidosis related MGRS. Light microscopy findings in AL, AH or AHL amyloidosis include acellular deposits in the glomeruli and blood vessels that stain pale eosinophilic, Congo red positive and the presence of apple green birefringence on polarized light. Findings on electron microscopy include non-branching fibrils randomly arranged with thickness of 7-14 nm.

Light chain proximal tubulopathy (LCPT) involves light chains with mutations of the hydrophobic residues of the variable domain causing them to have resistance to proteolysis; this causes the light chains to form intracytoplasmic aggregates in the proximal tubule of the nephron. Light microscopy findings in LCPT include proximal tubular swelling with electron microscopy findings showing proximal tubule light chain crystals or lysosomal inclusions.

Proliferative glomerulonephritis with monoclonal immunoglobulin deposits (PGNMID) involves monoclonal immunoglobulins (usually IgG) depositing in the glomeruli and activating complement leading to glomerular inflammation. Light microscopy shows a membranoproliferative, endocapillary proliferative or membranous glomerulonephropathy with electron dense deposits in the glomeruli being present on electron microscopy. The lesions stain positive for the Ig (usually IgG) as well as complement; leading to granular immunofluorescent deposits in the mesangium and glomerular basement membrane.

Monoclonal immunoglobulin deposition disease (MIDD) involves light chains with unusual characteristics of the variable domain (such as a positive charge, abnormal glycosylation, hydrophobic residues) depositing in the tubular, vascular or glomerular basement membranes of the nephron. These immune deposits activate TGF-β which leads to matrix accumulation and remodeling of the mesangium. The heavy chain variant of MIDD occurs when a deletion of the first constant domain of immunoglobulin heavy chains renders them unable to bind to light chains to form a complete immunoglobulin; the heavy chains are then deposited in the glomeruli. On light microscopy MIDD is seen as a nodular glomerulosclerosis with thickening of the tubular basement membrane with linear deposits along the glomerular, tubular vascular basement membranes seen on immunofluorescence.

C3 glomerulopathy is characterized by glomerular deposits of C3 complement protein (with scant or absent Ig immunoglobulin deposits) due to mutations or inhibition of complement regulatory proteins causing dysregulation of the alternative complement pathway. C3 glomerulopathy presents in light microscopy as mesangial proliferative, membranoproliferative or endocapillary proliferative glomerulonephritis. Unlike other causes of MGRS, the monoclonal immunoglobulins in C3 glomerulopathy are not deposited in the kidney nor do they directly cause kidney damage. In C3 glomerulopathy monoclonal immunoglobulins inhibit factor H (a complement regulatory protein) causing uninhibited activation of the alternative complement pathway and C3 deposition in the kidneys.

Cryoglobulinemic glomerulonephritis is characterized by glomerular involvement in those with cryoglobulinemia. In light microscopy it presents as a membranoproliferative or endocapillary proliferative glomerulonephritis with intracapillary monocytes and immune deposits that stain positive for PAS. On immunofluorescence the deposits consist of monoclonal light and heavy chains (most commonly IgG) and complement. Immunofluorescence can help distinguish the various subtypes of cryoglobulinemic glomerulonephritis. In a subtype of cryoglobulinemic glomerulonephritis known as crystalglobulinemia; monoclonal immunoglobulins may precipitate in the small arterioles and capillaries of the glomeruli when exposed to colder temperatures causing endothelial injury and microthrombi.

== Diagnosis ==
Several clinical signs are associated with MGRS including declining kidney function, microscopic hematuria, proteinuria (ranging from sub-nephrotic to nephrotic syndrome range proteinuria) and proximal tubular dysfunction which may present as Fanconi Syndrome. Once MGRS is suspected, it is critical to identify the monoclonal protein responsible for kidney toxicity or the cell line secreting the monoclonal protein. Usually MGRS disorders have small levels of circulating M-proteins (due to the small clonal burden of the underlying B-cell or plasma cell disorder) thus decreasing the sensitivity of serum protein electrophoresis (SPEP). Serum immunofixation electrophoresis is 10 times more sensitive than SPEP in the identification of M-proteins in MGRS. Serum protein electrophoresis, urine protein electrophoresis (UPEP), serum and urine immunofixation, serum free light chain assay, serum free light chain ratios and a bone marrow biopsy are required for the identification of the cell population secreting the pathologic monoclonal protein. A kidney biopsy should be performed in all cases of MGRS to confirm the M-protein's causal relationship with regards to kidney disease. The only exception is AL amyloidosis which can be diagnosed if AL deposits are detected in other tissues, such as peripheral fat. Overt hematologic malignancies such as multiple myeloma should be excluded.

== Treatment ==
The optimal treatment in MGRS is a clone directed therapy; where treatment is directed specifically to the cell line responsible for the pathologic monoclonal immunoglobulin or M-protein. The goal of therapy is to preserve kidney function, reduce the risk of MGRS recurrence after kidney transplant and maintain a sustained hematologic response. The difference of involved-uninvolved free light chains less than 4 or greater than a 90% reduction of involved free light chains are the minimum hematologic responses needed for the preservation of kidney function.

Plasma cell dyscrasias are best treated with the proteasome inhibitor bortezomib, often given with the steroid dexamethasone. Bortezomib can also be given before and after an autologous stem cell transplant (ASCT) with high dose of the chemotherapy medication mephalan given before ASCT to eradicate the monoclonal gammopathy prior to transplant and prevent recurrence. Alternative treatment options include immunomodulatory drugs such as thalidomide or lenalidomide. The monoclonal antibody against the plasma cell surface protein CD38 daratumumab may also be used with very high efficacy against AL amyloidosis.

B-cell dyscrasias associated with MGRS have less evidence for specific medications that are effective in achieving a hematologic response. With CD20 expressing B-cells and lymphoplasmacytic clones; rituximab is the preferred treatment and it can be combined with dexamethasone and cyclophosphamide. The benefit of ASCT in B-cell related MGRS is less established.

== Prognosis ==
Overall mortality of the various MGRS disorders is generally less than that of multiple myeloma, but light chain amyloidosis (AL type) with cardiac involvement is associated with rapid progression to death.
