= Monoclonality =

In biology, cells derived from a single clonal origin

In biology, monoclonality refers to the state of a line of cells that have been derived from a single clonal origin. Thus, "monoclonal cells" can be said to form a single clone. The term monoclonal comes from Ancient Greek monos 'alone, single' and klonos 'clone'.

The process of replication can occur in vivo, or may be stimulated in vitro for laboratory manipulations. The use of the term typically implies that there is some method to distinguish between the cells of the original population from which the single ancestral cell is derived, such as a random genetic alteration, which is inherited by the progeny.

Common usages of this term include:

- Monoclonal antibody: a single hybridoma cell, which by chance includes the appropriate V(D)J recombination to produce the desired antibody, is cloned to produce a large population of identical cells. In informal laboratory jargon, the monoclonal antibodies isolated from cell culture supernatants of these hybridoma clones (hybridoma lines) are simply called monoclonals.
- Monoclonal neoplasm (tumor): A single aberrant cell which has undergone carcinogenesis reproduces itself into a cancerous mass.
- Monoclonal plasma cell (also called plasma cell dyscrasia): A single aberrant plasma cell which has undergone carcinogenesis reproduces itself, which in some cases is cancerous.
