= TEMPI syndrome =

Orphan disease

- Other names: Telangiectasia-erythrocytosis-monoclonal gammopathy-perinephric-fluid collections-intrapulmonary shunting syndrome

TEMPI syndrome is an orphan disease where the patients share five characteristics from which the acronym is derived: telangiectasias, elevated erythropoietin and erythrocytosis, monoclonal gammopathy, perinephric fluid collection, and intrapulmonary shunting.

== Signs and symptoms ==
| TEMPI | Symptom |
|---|---|
| T | Telangiectasias |
| E | Elevated erythropoietin and erythrocytosis |
| M | Monoclonal gammopathy |
| P | Perinephric fluid collections |
| I | Intrapulmonary shunting |

The patients were all diagnosed at middle age. A monoclonal gammopathy was implicated in all patients tested.

== Cause ==
The cause of the syndrome is unknown. Abnormal plasma-cell clone and monoclonal gammopathy are suggested to be triggers of the disease.

== Diagnosis ==
The diagnosis is based on the five characteristics described above.

== Treatment ==
Complete and partial disappearance of the symptoms of the TEMPI syndrome was reported with the drugs bortezomib, daratumumab and autologous stem cell transplantation.

== History ==
In 2010, the case of a man with unexplained erythrocytosis and perinephric fluid collection as main features was described in the Case Records of the Massachusetts General Hospital.
