= Myeloma cast nephropathy =

- Other names: Cast nephropathy
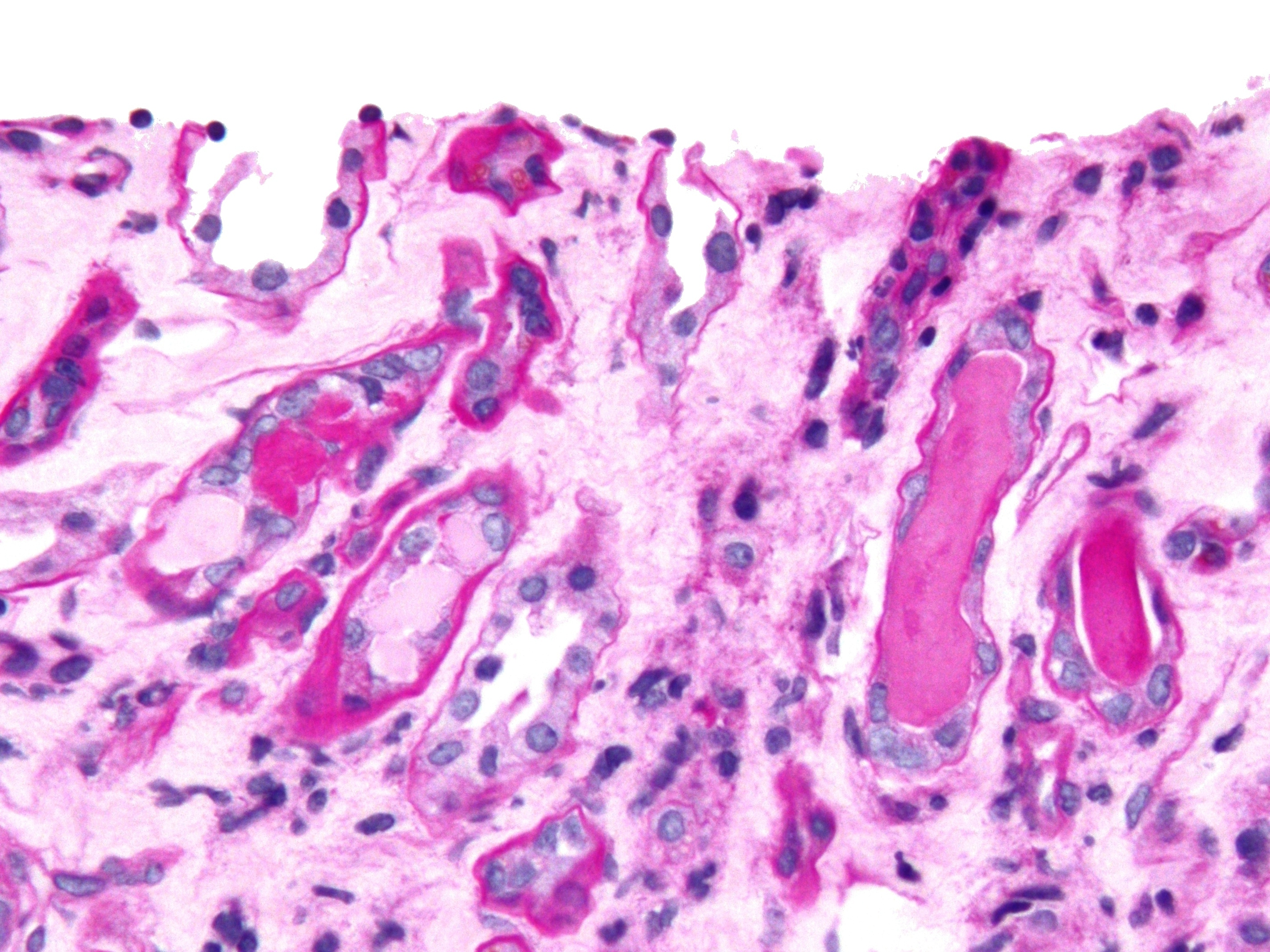
- Micrograph of myeloma cast nephropathy. Myelomatous casts are PAS negative (left of image). Hyaline casts are PAS positive (right of image). PAS stain. Kidney biopsy.
- Specialty: Nephrology

Myeloma cast nephropathy, also referred to as light-chain cast nephropathy, is the formation of plugs (urinary casts) in the kidney tubules from free immunoglobulin light chains leading to kidney failure in the context of multiple myeloma. It is the most common cause of kidney injury in myeloma.

In myeloma cast nephropathy, filtered κ or λ light chains that bind to Tamm-Horsfall protein precipitate in the kidney's tubules. Hypercalcemia and low fluid intake contribute to the development of casts.

Myeloma cast nephropathy is considered to be a medical emergency because if untreated, it leads to irreversible kidney failure.

It is diagnosed by histological examination of kidney biopsy.

== See also ==
- Serum-free light-chain measurement
