= Clone (B-cell) =

Part of process of immunological B-cell maturation

The process of immunological B-cell maturation involves transformation from an undifferentiated B cell to one that secretes antibodies with particular specificity. This differentiation and activation of the B cell occurs most rapidly after exposure to antigen by antigen-presenting cells in the reticuloendothelial system, and under modulation by T cells, and is closely intertwined with affinity maturation. B cells that respond most avidly to antigen are preferentially allowed to proliferate and mature, a process known as clonal selection.

In lymphocytic neoplastic diseases such as multiple myeloma and lymphoma, but also other illnesses, there can be a massive expansion of a single B-cell clone, detectable by measuring the excessively-produced antibodies, measured in a serum protein electrophoresis test or peripheral blood flow cytometry. Such an expansion is said to be "monoclonal", and monoclonal antibodies produced by such a group of B cells can cause illnesses such as amyloidosis and lupus, or can be indicative of an underlying malignancy. The concept of clonality is closely associated with malignancy, for example in diagnosing lymphomatoid skin lesions. The expansion of a particular clone of immune B cells is usually interpreted by clinicians as evidence of unrestricted cell growth, the hallmark of cancer.

== See also ==
- Clone (cell biology)
