= Skeletal survey =

Multiple x-rays of the body

- ICD-9-CM: 88.31

A skeletal survey (also called a bone survey) is a series of X-rays of all the bones in the body, or at least the axial skeleton and the large cortical bones. A very common use is the diagnosis of multiple myeloma, where tumour deposits appear as "punched-out" lesions. The standard set of X-rays for a skeletal survey includes X-rays of the skull, entire spine, pelvis, ribs, both humeri and femora (proximal long bones). It is more effective than isotope scans at detecting bone involvement in multiple myeloma. Although significantly less sensitive than MRI, it is easier to include more bones. A study found that MRI of just the spine and pelvis would have detected 9% fewer cases of bone involvement than the more extensive skeletal survey which therefore remains the standard method.

Skeletal surveys are also used with suspected non-accidental injury in children (CE guidelines state that 19 images of the child are taken.) These are reported on by a consultant paediatric radiologist and often copies are made. Non-accidental injury is suspected if a child sustains an injury where the clinical findings are not consistent with the explanation given for the injury, such as a spiral fracture in a child who is not yet walking.

A skull CT is also done in connection with the radiographs if the child is under one year old or, if the child is older, where there is a clinical requirement (perioribtal ecchymosis, for example) as to rule out abusive head trauma.

The results of a skeletal survey may be used in a court of law as evidence of child abuse.
