= International Myeloma Foundation =

American non-profit organization

- Nickname: IMF
- Formation: 1990
- Founder: Brian Novis; Susie Durie; Brian G.M. Durie
- Type: Non-profit organization
- Legal status: 501(c)(3)
- Purpose: cancer research, patient education
- Headquarters: Studio City, California, US
- Website: myeloma.org

The International Myeloma Foundation (IMF) is an American non-profit organization serving patients with myeloma, a cancer of plasma cells in the bone marrow. The organization is dedicated to improving the quality of life for all myeloma patients by focusing on four key areas: research, education, support, and advocacy.

Founded in 1990 by Brian Novis, Susie Novis, and Brian G.M. Durie, the IMF operates through four founding principles: research, education, support, and advocacy. The organization is a 501(c)(3) based in Studio City, California, and, according to its 2018 annual report, has a membership of 525,000 people in 140 countries. Its motto is "Improving lives — Finding the cure".

There are approximately 32,110 new patients diagnosed with myeloma each year in the U.S.

== History ==
=== Founding ===
The IMF was established in 1990 following Brian D. Novis's diagnosis with multiple myeloma at age 33. Novis co-founded the organization with his wife Susie Novis (later Novis-Durie) and his physician, Dr. Brian G.M. Durie, a hematologist-oncologist specializing in myeloma.

Brian Novis died of myeloma complications in July 1992. Following his death, Susie Novis-Durie assumed the role of Executive Director and later served as president and CEO for 31 years.

=== Leadership ===
Susie Novis-Durie led the IMF from 1992 until her retirement in 2021. Under her leadership, the organization expanded its educational programs, including the creation of the Patient & Family Seminar series in 1994. In 2002, she received the Joseph Michaeli Award for her contributions to myeloma research and treatment. In 2019, she was awarded an honorary doctorate from Vrije Universiteit Brussel in Belgium.

Dr. Brian G.M. Durie, a co-founder, served as Chairperson of the Board and Chief Scientific Officer until January 2025. Dr. Durie is known for developing the Durie-Salmon Staging System for multiple myeloma and has published over 700 research papers. He received honorary recognition including the Robert A. Kyle Lifetime Achievement Award in 2006.

In November 2021, Yelak Biru, a myeloma patient and former board member, was named president and CEO. He resigned from his position in February 2025.

As of February 2025, Diane Moran, RN, MA, EdM, served as interim CEO. Dr. S. Vincent Rajkumar, Professor of Medicine at Mayo Clinic, was elected Chairperson of the Board in early 2024.

In November 2025, Heather Cooper Ortner joined the IMF as president and CEO. Cooper Ortner previously served a tenure at the IMF as the Executive Vice President of Development. She went on to serve in roles such as president and CEO of Alzheimer’s Los Angeles and CEO of the Dr. Susan Love Research Foundation.

== Programs ==
=== Education and support ===
The IMF conducts educational Patient & Family Seminars, which began in Los Angeles in 1994 and have since been held in multiple countries including the United Kingdom, Czech Republic, Denmark, Germany, France, and Italy. The organization also hosts Regional Community Workshops in smaller communities across the United States and internationally.

The IMF helps facilitate a volunteer network of approximately 160 support groups, providing training, website hosting, and educational materials to support group leaders.

The IMF launched the M-Power Initiative®, a program focused on addressing health disparities and improving outcomes for African American patients with multiple myeloma. The initiative partners with medical centers and community organizations to increase awareness of myeloma symptoms and treatment options in underserved communities.

The organization produces publications on myeloma treatment and management, available in multiple languages, and maintains an InfoLine staffed by patient specialists for inquiries.

=== Nurse leadership board ===
The IMF established the Nurse Leadership Board®, a professional organization of oncology nursing experts from leading medical centers who specialize in myeloma care. The board develops practice guidelines and educational resources for nurses caring for myeloma patients.

=== Digital resources ===
The IMF developed Myelo®, described as the first multiple-myeloma-specific generative-AI chatbot, which provides 24/7 responses to patient questions about the disease. The organization also launched a Clinical Trials Matching Engine powered by SparkCures in October 2024, which helps patients identify relevant clinical trials based on their individual circumstances.

The IMF worked with the Association of Cancer Online Resources (ACOR) to create a myeloma mailing list an amyloid mailing list to facilitate information exchange and support.

=== Advocacy ===
The IMF's advocacy efforts include the Global Myeloma Action Network® (GMAN®), which consists of patient advocacy organizations from multiple countries. GMAN works to improve access to myeloma treatments and care worldwide, holding annual summits where advocates collaborate on policy initiatives.

== Research ==
The International Myeloma Working Group (IMWG), established in 2001, is a collaborative research consortium of myeloma researchers from institutions worldwide with over 300 members. The IMWG develops consensus guidelines for myeloma diagnosis and treatment that are used as treatment protocols globally and published in peer-reviewed journals.

=== Black Swan Research Initiative ===
Founded in 2012, the Black Swan Research Initiative® (BSRI®) is a collaborative research program focused on achieving a cure for myeloma through global partnerships spanning multiple continents. Notable BSRI projects include:

- iStopMM® (Iceland Screens, Treats, or Prevents Multiple Myeloma): A population-based screening study led by Dr. Sigurður Yngvi Kristinsson at the University of Iceland.
- ASCENT Trial: A phase II clinical trial evaluating early intervention strategies for patients with high-risk smoldering myeloma.

=== Brian D. Novis Research Grants ===
The IMF awards research grants through the Brian D. Novis Research Grant Program, established in 1994 in memory of the organization's co-founder. The program provides funding to junior and senior investigators working on myeloma research.

=== Research Networks and Resources ===
The IMF supports regional research networks including the Asian Myeloma Network® (AMN®) and the Latin American Myeloma Network, which facilitate collaboration among myeloma specialists in their respective regions.

== Fundraising ==
The IMF's fundraising activities include an annual Comedy Celebration benefiting the Peter Boyle Memorial fund, held each November. In 2024, the organization launched the Iceland Cycling Expedition, a multi-day cycling event in Iceland that raises funds for myeloma research, with particular emphasis on supporting the iStopMM study.

== Recognition ==
The organization holds a 4-star rating from Charity Navigator and a Platinum Seal from Candid/GuideStar.

== Tax status ==
In the United States, IMF is categorized as a 501(c) non-profit organization by the Internal Revenue Service (IRS).
