= Hapten =

Molecule which triggers an immune response when attached to a carrier

Haptens (derived from the Greek haptein, meaning “to fasten”) are small molecules that elicit an immune response only when attached to a large carrier such as a protein; the carrier may be one that also does not elicit an immune response by itself. The mechanisms of absence of immune response may vary and involve complex immunological interactions, but can include absent or insufficient co-stimulatory signals from antigen-presenting cells.

Attaching of haptens to a carrier molecule lead to a complete antigen.

Haptens have been used to study allergic contact dermatitis (ACD) and the mechanisms of inflammatory bowel disease (IBD) to induce autoimmune-like responses.

The concept of haptens emerged from the work of Austrian immunologist Karl Landsteiner, who also pioneered the use of synthetic haptens to study immunochemical phenomena.

== Immune reaction on a hapten–carrier adduct ==
Haptens applied on skin, when conjugate with a carrier, could induce contact hypersensitivity, which is a type IV delayed hypersensitivity reaction mediated by T cells and dendritic cells. It consists of two phases: sensitization and elicitation. The sensitization phase where the hapten is applied to the skin for the first time is characterized by the activation of innate immune responses, including migration of dendritic cells to the lymph nodes, priming antigen-specific naive T cells, and the generation of antigen-specific effector or memory T cells and B cells and antibody-secreting plasma cells. The second elicitation phase where the hapten is applied to a different skin area starts with activation of effector T cells followed by T cell-mediated tissue damage and antibody-mediated immune responses. Haptens initially activate innate immune responses by complex mechanisms involving inflammatory cytokines, damage-associated molecular patterns (DAMP), or the inflammasome.

Once the body has generated antibodies to a hapten–carrier adduct, the small-molecule hapten may also be able to bind to the antibody, but it will usually not initiate an immune response; usually only the hapten–carrier adduct can do this. Sometimes the small-molecule hapten can even block immune response to the hapten–carrier adduct by preventing the adduct from binding to the antibody, a process called hapten inhibition.

A well-known example of a hapten is urushiol, which is the toxin found in poison ivy. When absorbed through the skin from a poison ivy plant, urushiol undergoes oxidation in the skin cells to generate the actual hapten, a reactive quinone-type molecule, which then reacts with skin proteins to form hapten adducts. After a second exposure, the proliferated T-cells become activated, generating an immune reaction that produces typical blisters of a urushiol-induced contact dermatitis.

Another example of a hapten-mediated contact dermatitis is nickel allergy, which is caused by nickel metal ions penetrating the skin and binding to skin proteins.

== Examples of haptens ==
A lot of haptens are comprised in different kinds of drugs, pesticides, hormones, food toxins etc. Most important factor is the molecular mass, which is <1000 Da.

The first researched haptens were aniline and its carboxyl derivatives (o-, m-, and p-aminobenzoic acid).

Some haptens can induce autoimmune disease. An example is hydralazine, a blood pressure-lowering drug that occasionally can produce drug-induced lupus erythematosus in certain individuals. This also appears to be the mechanism by which the anesthetic gas halothane can cause a life-threatening hepatitis, as well as the mechanism by which penicillin-class drugs cause autoimmune hemolytic anemia.

Other haptens that are commonly used in molecular biology applications include fluorescein, biotin, digoxigenin, and dinitrophenol.

Antibodies have successfully been raised against endogenous & unreactive small molecules such as some neurotransmitters (e.g. serotonin (5HT), glutamate, dopamine, GABA, tryptamine, glycine, noradrenaline), amino acids (e.g. tryptophan, 5-hydroxytryptophan, 5-methoxytryptophan), by using glutaraldehyde to crosslink these molecules to carrier proteins suitable for immune recognition. Notably, detection of such small molecules in tissues requires the tissue to be glutaraldehyde-fixed, as the glutaraldehyde covalent-linkage on the molecule of interest often forms a portion of the antibody recognized epitope.

== Hapten conjugation ==
Due to their nature and properties, hapten-carrier adducts have been essential in immunology. They have been used to evaluate the properties of specific epitopes and antibodies. They are important in the purification and production of monoclonal antibodies. They are also vital in the development of sensitive quantitative and qualitative immunoassays. However, to achieve the best and most desirable results, many factors are needed to be taken into the design of hapten conjugates. These include the method of hapten conjugation, the type of carrier used and the hapten density. Variations in these factors could lead to different strengths of immune response toward the newly formed antigenic determinant.

=== Carriers ===
In general, carrier proteins should be immunogenic and contain enough amino acid residues in the reactive side chains to conjugate with the haptens. For protein haptenation to occur, hapten must be electron deficient (electrophilic), either by itself, or it can be converted to a protein-reactive species for example by air oxidation or cutaneous metabolism. Haptens become fastened to a carrier molecule by a covalent bond. Depending on the haptens being used, other factors in considering the carrier proteins could include their in vivo toxicity, commercial availability and cost.

The most common carriers include serum globulin, albumins, ovalbumin and many others. Human serum albumin (HSA) is often the model protein of choice for protein-binding assays. This is a well-characterized protein, and the role of albumin in blood and tissues in vivo is often to bind to xenobiotics via its substrate-binding pockets and remove the invading chemical from the circulation or tissue, thus acting as a detoxification mechanism.

Although proteins are mostly employed for hapten conjugation, synthetic polypeptides such as Poly-L-glutamic acid, polysaccharides and liposomes could also be used.

=== Mechanisms of protein binding ===
Most common reaction mechanisms forming covalent bonds and predicted to be involved in sensitization are nucleophilic substitution on a saturated centre, nucleophilic substitution on an unsaturated centre and nucleophilic addition. Other reactions are also possible, such as electrophilic substitution (diazonium salts), radical reactions, and ionic reactions.

=== Methods of hapten conjugation ===
While selecting a suitable method for hapten conjugation, functional groups on the hapten and its carrier must be identified. Depending on the groups present, one of the two main strategies could be employed:

1. Spontaneous chemical reaction: Used when hapten is a chemical reactive molecule such as anhydrides and isocyanates. This method of conjugation is spontaneous and no cross-linking agents are needed.
2. Intermediary molecules cross-linkage: This method mainly applies to nonreactive haptens. Agents with at least two chemically reactive groups such as carbodiimide or glutaraldehyde are to aid the conjugation of haptens to their carriers. The extent of cross-linkage is dependent upon the hapten/carrier to coupling agent ratio, hapten/carrier concentration and the temperature, pH of the environment.
  - Carbodiimide: A group of compounds with a general formula of R-N=C=N-R′, where R and R′ are either aliphatic (i.e., diethylcarbodiimide) or aromatic (i.e., diphenylcarbodiimide). Conjugation using a carbodiimide requires the presence of α or ɛ-amino and a carboxyl group. The amino group usually comes from the lysyl residue of the carrier protein while the carboxyl group comes from the hapten. The exact mechanism for this reaction is still unknown. However, two pathways are proposed. The first postulates that an intermediate that can react with an amine is formed. The second stating that a rearrangement of an acyl urea, the main side product of the reaction at high temperature, has occurred.
  - Glutaraldehyde: This method works by the reaction between glutaraldehyde with amine groups to form Schiff bases or Michael-type double bond addition products. The yield of conjugates can be controlled by varying the pH of the reaction. Higher pH would give rise to more Schiff base intermediates and subsequently lead to the increase in hapten conjugates' number and size. Overall, cross-linkage involving glutaraldehyde is very stable. However, immunized animals tend to recognize glutaraldehyde's cross-linking bridges as epitopes.
3. High performance capillary electrophoresis: High performance capillary electrophoresis (HPCE) is an alternative method in optimizing hapten-protein conjugation. HPCE is predominantly used in separating carbohydrates with a very high separation capacity. There are numerous advantages to using HPCE as a technique to investigate certain conjugates such as only requiring minute sample sizes (nl). In addition, the sample used does not need to be pure and no type of radiolabeling is needed. A great benefit to this method of hapten conjugation is that there is automated analysis of sample and the testing of sample interactions can be determined in free solution. This method of hapten-protein conjugation is exceptionally effective with conjugates of low epitope densities, where it is otherwise very challenging by the use of other methods to determine their electrical or ionic mobility.

== Clinical use ==
=== Hapten inhibition ===
Hapten inhibition or "semi-hapten" is the inhibition of a type III hypersensitivity response. In inhibition, free hapten molecules bind with antibodies toward that molecule without causing the immune response, leaving fewer antibodies left to bind to the immunogenic hapten-protein adduct. An example of a hapten inhibitor is dextran 1, which is a small fraction (1 kilodalton) of the entire dextran complex, which is enough to bind anti-dextran antibodies, but insufficient to result in the formation of immune complexes and resultant immune responses.

=== Research ===
Haptens are widely used in immunology and related fields. Sensitizing chemicals can cause different forms of allergy, allergic contact dermatitis, or sensitization of the respiratory tract. Interestingly, discrete types of chemicals induce divergent immune responses: contact allergens provoke preferential type I hypersensitivity responses, whereas respiratory allergens stimulate selective type II responses, which could be very suitable for modeling how the immune response is polarized towards different types of antigens.

In allergology, in vitro/in silico tests for skin sensitization, hazard identification, and potency evaluation on different drug and cosmetic components are highly preferred in early product development. The ability of a drug to act as a hapten is a clear indication of potential immunogenicity.

Hapten-specific antibodies are used in broad area of different immunoassays, immunobiosensor technologies and immunoaffinity chromatography purification columns; those antibodies could be used to detect small environmental contaminants, drugs of abuse, vitamins, hormones, metabolites, food toxins and environmental pollutants.

== See also ==
- Toxin
- Antigen
