= Drug-induced urticaria =

- Specialty: Dermatology
- Symptoms: itching, burning, redness, and swelling
- Usual onset: 1-24 hours after ingestion/application
- Duration: 1-72 hours
- Diagnostic method: The onset of symptoms following the use of a medication.
- Treatment: Can resolve without treatment, but may require anti-histamines or corticosteroids.

One of the most prevalent forms of adverse drug reactions is cutaneous reactions, with drug-induced urticaria ranking as the second most common type, preceded by drug-induced exanthems. Urticaria, commonly known as hives, manifests as weals, itching, burning, redness, swelling, and angioedema—a rapid swelling of lower skin layers, often more painful than pruritic. These symptoms may occur concurrently, successively, or independently. Typically, when a drug triggers urticaria, symptoms manifest within 24 hours of ingestion, aiding in the identification of the causative agent. Urticaria symptoms usually subside within 1–24 hours, while angioedema may take up to 72 hours to resolve completely.

== Mechanisms of drug-induced urticaria ==
Drug-induced urticaria occurs by immunologic and nonimmunologic mechanisms. The primary mechanism for drug-induced urticaria involves a type-I hypersensitivity reaction mediated by IgE antibodies, commonly observed with ß-lactam use. This immune-mediated reaction necessitates a sensitization period, leading to more severe systemic reactions, including angioedema and anaphylaxis.

Additionally, drug-induced urticaria can result from the activation of the complement cascade, a type-III hypersensitivity mediated by immune complexes. Complement cascade activation generates anaphylatoxins, releasing chemical mediators from basophils and mast cells, subsequently causing urticaria. This mechanism is seen in serum sickness and is associated with systemic symptoms such as fever, joint pain, and neurological symptoms.

Some medications, like opioids and certain other drugs, induce urticaria by directly acting on mast cells, triggering histamine release. Non-steroidal anti-inflammatory drugs (NSAIDs) contribute uniquely to urticaria by inhibiting the COX-1 pathway, leading to increased production of leukotrienes, vasodilators implicated in edema and urticaria. NSAIDs are the most common culprit of drug-induced urticaria and reactions to NSAIDs are often associated with angioedema.

Topical medications, typically cause contact dermatitis, though can also induce urticaria through immune-mediated or non-immunological mechanisms. Antibiotics, often present in topical creams, are a common source of contact urticaria.

== Treatment and prevention ==
Patients experiencing drug-induced urticaria should avoid the causative drug if possible. When avoidance is not feasible, alternatives, such as using selective COX-2 inhibitors in place of typical NSAIDs, may be considered. Evidence suggests that individuals with NSAID-induced urticaria, particularly with angioedema, may develop tolerance over time. Pre-treatment with anti-histamines or leukotriene antagonists can potentially prevent reactions in cases where avoidance or substitution is challenging.

For post-exposure urticaria, discontinuation of the offending medication is crucial. Symptoms typically resolve upon removal of the causal agent, and management may involve anti-histamines or corticosteroids based on the severity of the reaction.

== List of medications known to cause urticaria ==
- Nonsteroidal anti-inflammatory agents
- Antibiotics: cephalosporins, penicillins, tetracyclines, aminoglycosides, sulfonamides, sorbitol complexes,
- Angiotensin-converting enzyme (ACE) inhibitors
- Hydralazine
- Narcotic analgesics
- Contrast media
- Enzymes: streptokinase, trypsin, chymopapain
- Vaccines
- Antifungal agents: ketoconazole, fluconazole
- Steroids
- Polypeptide hormones: insulin, corticotrophin
- Vasopressin
- Anesthetic agents (local and general)
- Quinidine
- Anticancer drugs
- Muscle myorelaxants (curare)
- Mannitol
- Dextrans
- Protamine
- Vitamins

== See also ==
- List of cutaneous conditions
- Localized heat contact urticaria
- Skin lesion
- Urticarial dermatoses
