= Cefaclor =

Chemical compound

Clinical data
- Trade names: Biocef, Ceclor, Medacef, Distaclor, Keflor, Raniclor
- AHFS/Drugs.com: Monograph
- MedlinePlus: a682729
- Pregnancy category: AU: B1
- Routes of administration: Oral
- ATC code: J01DC04 (WHO)

Legal status
- Legal status: In general: ℞ (Prescription only)

Pharmacokinetic data
- Bioavailability: Well absorbed, independent of food intake
- Metabolism: 15% to 40%
- Elimination half-life: 0.6 to 0.9 hours
- Excretion: Renal

Identifiers
- IUPAC name: (6R,7R)-7-{[(2R)-2-amino-2-phenylacetyl]amino}- 3-chloro-8-oxo-5-thia-1-azabicyclo[4.2.0]oct-2-ene- 2-carboxylic acid
- CAS Number: 53994-73-3
- PubChem CID: 51038
- DrugBank: DB00833
- ChemSpider: 46260
- UNII: 3Z6FS3IK0K
- KEGG: D00256
- ChEMBL: ChEMBL8867
- CompTox Dashboard (EPA): DTXSID3022748
- ECHA InfoCard: 100.053.536

Chemical and physical data
- Formula: C_{15}H_{14}ClN_{3}O_{4}S
- Molar mass: 367.80 g·mol^{−1}
- 3D model (JSmol): Interactive image
- SMILES: O=C2N1/C(=C(/Cl)CS[C@@H]1[C@@H]2NC(=O)[C@@H](c3ccccc3)N)C(=O)O.O
- InChI: InChI=1S/C15H14ClN3O4S.H2O/c16-8-6-24-14-10(13(21)19(14)11(8)15(22)23)18-12(20)9(17)7-4-2-1-3-5-7;/h1-5,9-10,14H,6,17H2,(H,18,20)(H,22,23);1H2/t9-,10-,14-;/m1./s1; Key:WKJGTOYAEQDNIA-IOOZKYRYSA-N

Cefaclor, sold under the trade name Ceclor among others, is a second-generation cephalosporin antibiotic used to treat certain bacterial infections such as pneumonia and infections of the ear, lung, skin, throat, and urinary tract. It is also available from other manufacturers as a generic.

It was patented in 1973 and approved for medical use in 1979.

== Medical uses ==
Cefaclor belongs to the family of antibiotics known as the cephalosporins (cefalosporins). The cephalosporins are broad-spectrum antibiotics that are used for the treatment of septicaemia, pneumonia, meningitis, biliary tract infections, peritonitis, and urinary tract infections. The pharmacology of the cephalosporins is similar to that of the penicillins, excretion being principally renal (the unused portion is found in urine). Cephalosporins penetrate the cerebrospinal fluid poorly unless the meninges are inflamed; cefotaxime is a more suitable cephalosporin than cefaclor for infections of the central nervous system, e.g. meningitis. Cefaclor is active against many bacteria, including both Gram-negative and Gram-positive organisms.

=== Spectrum of activity ===
Cefaclor is frequently used against bacteria responsible for causing skin infections, otitis media, urinary tract infections, and others. Cefaclor has been shown to be active against most strains of the following microorganisms, both in vitro and in clinical infections: Gram positive aerobes - Staphylococci (including coagulase-positive, coagulase-negative, and penicillinase-producing strains), Streptococcus pneumoniae, and Streptococcus pyogenes (group A β-hemolytic streptococci).

The following represents MIC susceptibility data for a few medically significant microorganisms.

- Haemophilus influenzae: 0.03 μg/mL - 128 μg/mL
- Staphylcoccus aureus: 0.6 μg/mL - 128 μg/mL
- Streptococcus pyogenes: 0.06 μg/mL - 4 μg/mL

== Cautions and contraindications ==
Cautions include known sensitivity to beta-lactam antibacterials, such as penicillins (Cefaclor should be avoided if there is a history of immediate hypersensitivity reaction); renal impairment (no dose adjustment required, although manufacturer advises caution); pregnancy and breast-feeding (but appropriate to use); false positive urinary glucose (if tested for reducing substances) and false positive Coombs test. Cefaclor has also been reported to cause a serum sickness-like reaction in children.

Cefaclor is contraindicated in case of hypersensitivity (i.e. allergy) to cephalosporins.

== Side effects ==
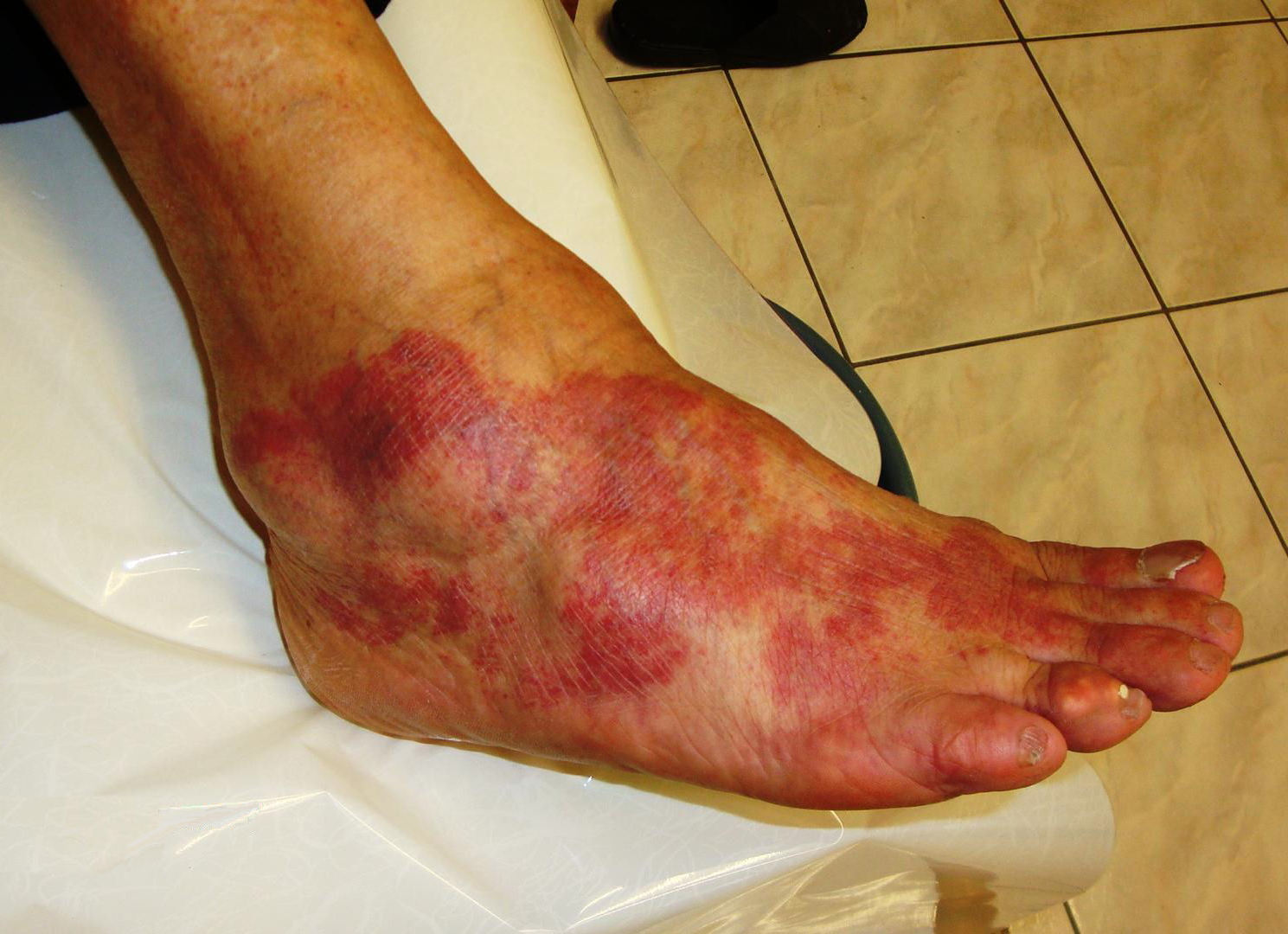
Skin allergy to cefaclor

The principal side effect of the cephalosporins is hypersensitivity. Penicillin-sensitive patients may also be allergic to the cephalosporins, depending on the side chain and it's relation to the penicillin allergy. Most patients with penicillin allergy can tolerate the majority of cephalosporins without allergic reactions. The previous percentage of 10% cross reactivity rates are a gross overestimation. Allergic reactions may present as, for example, rashes, pruritus (itching), urticaria, serum sickness-like reactions with rashes, fever and arthralgia, and anaphylaxis. The frequency and severity of serum sickness-like reactions in children has led researchers to question its role in pediatric illness. Other side effects include gastrointestinal disturbances (e.g. diarrhea, nausea and vomiting, abdominal discomfort, disturbances in liver enzymes, transient hepatitis and cholestatic jaundice), headache, and Stevens–Johnson syndrome. Rare side effects include eosinophilia and blood disorders (including thrombocytopenia, leucopenia, agranulocytosis, aplastic anaemia and haemolytic anaemia); reversible interstitial nephritis; hyperactivity, nervousness, sleep disturbances, hallucinations, confusion, hypertonia, and dizziness. Toxic epidermal necrolysis has been reported. In the UK, The Committee on the Safety of Medicines (CSM) has warned that the risk of diarrhea and rarely antibiotic-associated colitis are more likely with higher doses.

=== Pregnancy and breastfeeding ===
Cefaclor is passed into the breast milk in small quantities, but is generally accepted to be safe to take during breastfeeding. Cefaclor is not known to be harmful in pregnancy.

== Interactions ==
=== Coumarins ===
Cephalosporins possibly enhance the anticoagulant effect of coumarins (e.g. Warfarin) - change in patient's clinical condition, particularly associated with liver disease, intercurrent illness, or drug administration, necessitates more frequent testing of INR, and dose adjustment as necessary.

=== Probenecid ===
Excretion of cephalosporins is reduced by probenecid (resulting in increased concentrations of drug in the blood plasma).

=== Antacids ===
Absorption of cefaclor is reduced by antacids. Therefore antacids should not be taken right before or at the same time as cefaclor.
