= Fibrinoid necrosis =

Deposition of fibrin within blood vessel walls

Fibrinoid necrosis is a pathological lesion that affects blood vessels, and is characterized by the occurrence of endothelial damage, followed by leakage of plasma proteins, including fibrinogen, from the vessel lumen; these proteins infiltrate and deposit within the vessel walls, where fibrin polymerization subsequently ensues.

Although the term fibrinoid essentially means "fibrin-like", it has been confirmed through immunohistochemical analysis and electron microscopy that the areas referred to as "fibrin-like" do contain fibrin, whose predominant presence contributes to the bright, eosinophilic (pinkish) and structureless appearance of the affected vessels.

The earliest documented identification of fibrinoid changes dates back to 1880, when it was questioned whether these histological changes resulted from the deposition of a fibrinous exudate, or the degeneration and breakdown of collagen fibers.

The term fibrinoid was introduced to describe these changes, because distinguishing fibrinoid from hyaline deposits posed a significant challenge, as both exhibit a similar appearance under standard light microscopy. This morphological similarity necessitated the use of specialized histological staining techniques, such as phosphotungstic acid hematoxylin and various types of trichrome stains, to facilitate the distinction of fibrinoid material. Because these stains possess the ability to highlight and identify fibrin, this led to the term fibrinoid, which means "fibrin-like", being used to describe the affected vessels.

Nevertheless, as early as 1957, fibrin was indeed identified within fibrinoid, and by 1982, this understanding had advanced, with many researchers recognizing fibrinoid as a complex structure primarily composed of fibrin interwoven with various plasma proteins.

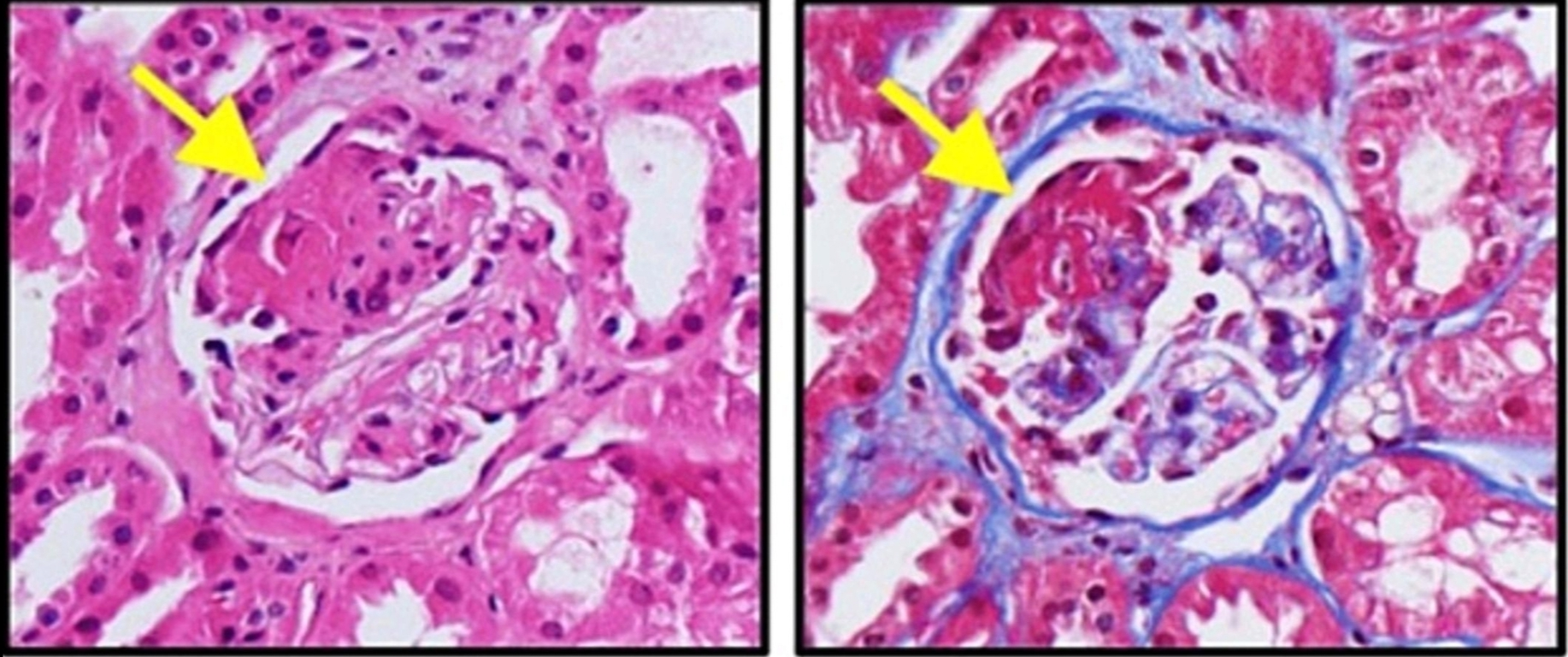
A renal biopsy from a patient with anti-neutrophil cytoplasmic antibody (ANCA)-associated glomerulonephritis reveals a lesion characterized by bright eosinophilia on H&E staining (yellow arrow, left) and intense red staining with trichrome (right), confirming the presence of fibrinoid necrosis. (Note: This figure illustrates that Masson's trichrome stain also helps to distinguish between fibrinoid necrosis, and sclerosis in renal biopsies.)

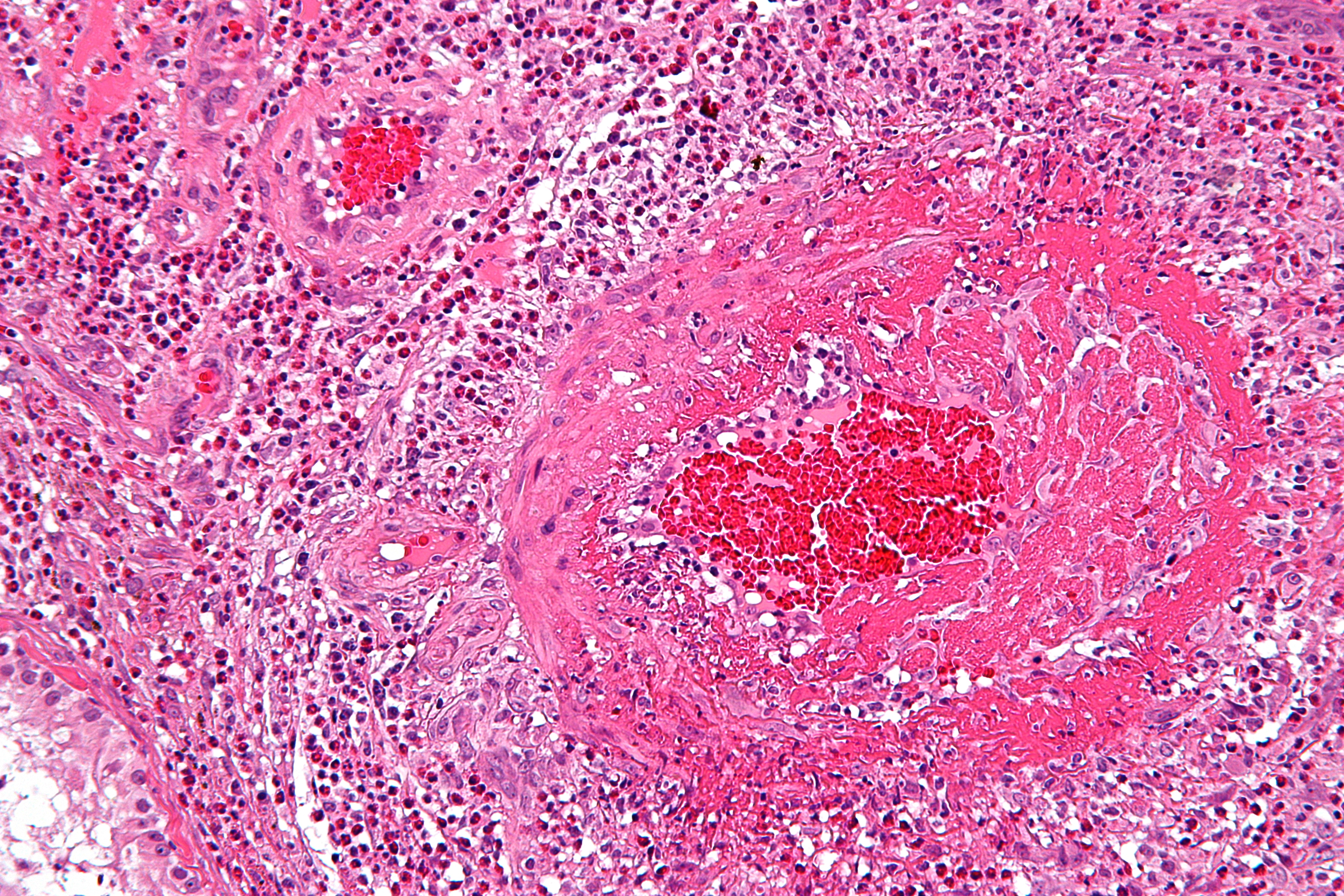
An H&E micrograph showing (intensely pink) fibrinoid necrosis (large blood vessel – right of image) in a case of vasculitis (eosinophilic granulomatosis with polyangiitis).

== Nomenclature ==
=== A misnomer ===
The term fibrinoid necrosis is, in fact, considered a misnomer, as the intense eosinophilic staining of the accumulated plasma proteins masks the true nature of the underlying changes in the blood vessel, and makes it virtually impossible to definitively determine whether the cells of the vessel wall are actually undergoing necrosis.

A 2000 review stated that "whether the lesion is truly necrotic, in the sense that it reflects the result of unprogrammed cell death, has never been investigated in depth", and an electron microscopy study examining fibrinoid necrosis in rat models with induced pulmonary hypertension found that fibrinoid changes weren't necessarily associated with necrosis of the smooth muscles of the media, and therefore recommended using the term fibrinoid vasculosis instead.

However, despite the inaccuracy, the microscopic characteristics of fibrinoid changes strongly resemble those of necrotic tissue, which is why the term fibrinoid necrosis continues to be used, even though it may not fully reflect the true underlying process.

=== Fibrinoid necrosis and lipohyalinosis ===
In 1971, CM Fisher, a pioneering figure in cerebral vascular diseases, proposed using the term lipohyalinosis as a replacement for fibrinoid necrosis, based on his observation that the affected fibrinoid areas also contained lipid.

The term lipohyalinosis was intended to serve as a synonym for fibrinoid necrosis, yet it is strictly used to describe the pathological fibrinoid changes in the cerebral vessels of patients with malignant hypertension. Even though the same pathological process, that affects cerebral blood vessels in malignant hypertension, also occurs in the arterioles of other organs, such as the kidneys and mesentery, lipohyalinosis is not used to describe these changes outside the brain, and fibrinoid necrosis remains the more widely recognized term for similar processes in other organs.

However, a common misconception in many textbooks is the failure to clarify that lipohyalinosis and fibrinoid necrosis are actually two descriptions of the same pathological process.

Instead of recognizing their equivalence, they are often presented as distinct stages, where lipohyalinosis is mistakenly described as a later consequence of fibrinoid necrosis, or lipohyalinosis is sometimes erroneously used interchangeably with arteriolosclerosis, which is a much broader term used to describe pathological changes in small arteries caused by a variety of conditions. Mislabeling lipohyalinosis as arteriolosclerosis overlooks the specific nature of lipohyalinosis as a condition involving fibrinoid necrosis (a particular form of vascular injury) and contributes to confusion.

== Localization ==
Fibrinoid necrosis predominantly affects small blood vessels, such as arterioles and glomeruli, but it can also involve medium-sized vessels, as observed in conditions like polyarteritis nodosa. It can also exhibit a highly segmental distribution, where the fibrinoid material does not uniformly coat the affected vessel but instead appears in isolated patches that are spaced along the length of the vessel wall.

Fibrinoid infiltration in affected vessels may be confined to the subintimal region, as the ground substance of the intima and the inner elastic lamina often act as a barrier, limiting further penetration of fibrin into the arterial wall. However, if the internal elastic lamina is disrupted, fibrin may extend into the media, where it is typically contained by the outer elastic lamina, potentially spreading circumferentially along its inner surface. In some cases, fibrin may extend into the adventitia or even escape from the vessels into surrounding perivascular tissue or adjacent spaces. This phenomenon is observed in conditions such as antineutrophil cytoplasmic antibody (ANCA)-associated vasculitis, where fibrin can infiltrate the urinary space near glomerular capillaries or the air space adjacent to alveolar capillaries.

== Associated diseases ==
Fibrinoid necrosis is observed in a wide range of pathological conditions such as:

- Immunologically-mediated vasculitides including:
1. Antineutrophil cytoplasmic antibody (ANCA)-associated vasculitis: Fibrinoid necrosis is a classical finding in these small-vessel vasculitides, and it has been referred to as "the ANCA-associated lesion" even though it occurs in other conditions as well.
2. Polyarteritis nodosa (PAN): The hallmark morphological characteristic of PAN is fibrinoid necrosis. In contrast, fibrinoid necrosis in Kawasaki disease is less pronounced than in PAN, despite both being forms of medium-sized vessel vasculitides.
3. Systemic lupus erythematosus.
4. Leucocytoclastic vasculitis.
5. Systemic sclerosis, arthus reaction (a type III hypersensitivity reaction) and rheumatoid subcutaneous nodules.

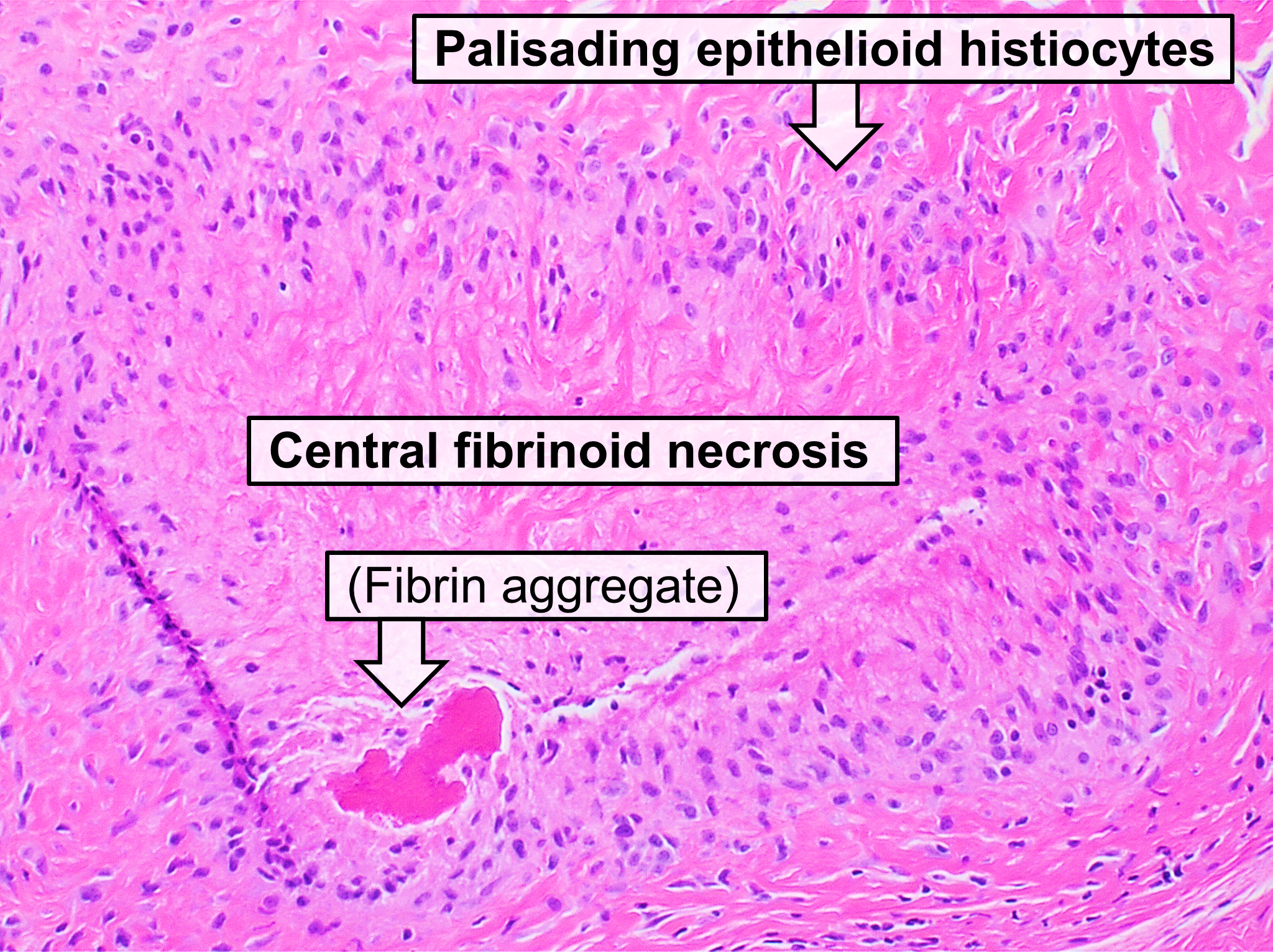
An H&E-stained micrograph of a rheumatoid nodule reveals its characteristic histological structure, featuring a central core composed of fibrinoid necrosis, and surrounding this core is a layer of palisading macrophages and epithelioid histiocytes.

- Malignant hypertension: Fibrinoid necrosis arises in the systemic circulation as a typical feature of malignant hypertension, and it's observed, for example, in the arterioles of the kidney, brain, retina, and other organs.
- Thrombotic microangiopathy, and rejection of kidney grafts.
- Preeclampsia: Fibrinoid necrosis occurs in the uterine spiral arterioles in preeclampsia, and involves the deposition of a dense, eosinophilic material beneath the endothelial lining of the affected vessels.
- Gestational diabetes mellitus may also result in fibrinoid necrosis, and vascular lesions similar to preeclampsia.
- Cerebral amyloid angiopathy.
- COVID-19 infection.
- Sarcoidosis: Fibrinoid necrosis may be observed in the central region of sarcoid granulomas, providing a histopathological distinction from the caseous necrosis characteristic of granulomas in tuberculosis.
- Cerebral radiation necrosis: It is a late complication of radiotherapy, which affects 5–15% of patients treated for brain or head-and-neck malignancies, and occurs within months to years after treatment. It arises from radiation-induced brain tissue and vascular damage, leading to endothelial proliferation, fibrinoid necrosis, vessel narrowing, ischemia, and brain parenchymal necrosis.

== Pathogenesis ==
- Fibrinoid necrosis occurs as a consequence of endothelial injury, which permits the leakage of plasma proteins into the blood vessel walls. This endothelial damage may arise due to a variety of underlying factors; for instance:
1. Anti-neutrophil cytoplasmic antibodies (ANCAs) target neutrophils, inducing the release of proteolytic enzymes. These enzymes, in conjunction with reactive oxygen species and complement system activation, contribute to endothelial damage, resulting in the formation of gaps within the capillary walls.
2. Immune complex deposition, as in leucocytoclastic vasculitis and arthus reaction, activates the complement cascade, leading to the recruitment and activation of neutrophils, which release lysosomal enzymes that damage the vascular endothelium.
3. High blood pressure in malignant hypertension causes direct traumatic injury to the blood vessel wall, primarily due to increased tension, and mechanical stress on the arterial walls. Numerous studies have shown that sudden and substantial blood pressure elevations can induce fibrinoid changes within minutes, providing strong evidence that elevated blood pressure alone is the cause of fibrinoid necrosis.
4. In cerebral radiation necrosis, radiotherapy can directly damage the plasma membrane of multiple cell types, including endothelial cells, and trigger the enzymatic hydrolysis of sphingomyelin and the generation of ceramide. Ceramide subsequently increases the production of reactive oxygen species, which activate an inflammatory cascade that eventually results in the formation of thrombi and fibrinoid necrosis.
- Endothelial cell damage results in the loss of the normal barrier function, and allows plasma components, including coagulation factors, to escape from the bloodstream and leak out into the blood vessel walls and the surrounding spaces. The coagulation factors that leak from the damaged blood vessels interact with various thrombogenic substances, such as tissue factor, which culminates in the formation of fibrin.
  The accumulation of fibrin, together with other plasma proteins, immunoglobulins, complement proteins, and sometimes necrotic smooth muscle cells from the media, leads to the characteristic eosinophilic, smudgy appearance of fibrinoid necrosis.

== Clinical relevance ==
=== Pathological consequences ===
==== Ischemia ====
- In malignant hypertension, fibrinoid necrosis of the afferent arterioles and glomeruli, combined with hyperplastic arteriolosclerosis, can result in obliteration of glomeruli and loss of tubules. This process contributes to progressive renal failure and uremia, which, if left untreated, leads to a mortality rate of approximately 90% within one year.
- A variety of vasculitides can lead to the development of peripheral neuropathies, if they affect the blood vessels supplying the nerves, known as the vasa nervorum. The vascular injury associated with vasculitis, characterized by inflammatory cell infiltration and fibrinoid necrosis, can cause vessel wall damage, or narrowing of the vasa nervorum; this leads to ischemia and nerve damage, and ultimately gives rise to the clinical manifestations of neuropathy.

==== Hemorrhage ====
Whenever hypertension induces fibrinoid necrosis in the small cerebral arteries, this considerably raises the risk of intracerebral hemorrhage (ICH) due to two main factors:

1. The deposition of fibrinoid material in the vessel wall leads to thickening of the arterial walls, making them progressively more rigid and less elastic.
2. The narrowing of the arterial lumens further exacerbates this by raising intraluminal pressure.

As a result, the small cerebral arteries become more fragile and prone to rupture, which may ultimately lead to ICH.

==== Retinal detachment ====
When blood pressure rises significantly, as in malignant hypertension or eclampsia, retinal arterioles can undergo fibrinoid necrosis, reducing blood supply to the choriocapillaris, which is responsible for nourishing the retinal pigment epithelium (RPE). Ischemia disrupts RPE function, compromises the blood-retinal barrier and causes fluid leakage into the subretinal space, and the development of exudative retinal detachment.

=== Diagnostic value ===
Fibrinoid necrosis serves as an important diagnostic clue in recognizing vascular pathologies, and helping to guide further investigation and treatment; for instance:

- In cases where symptoms suspicious of giant cell arteritis (GCA) are present, but a temporal artery biopsy reveals fibrinoid necrosis in small vessels branching from the temporal artery, and the absence of the typical GCA histological features, this discrepancy may suggest an alternative diagnosis, as the occurrence of fibrinoid necrosis in GCA is extremely rare. Although ANCA-associated vasculitis primarily affects organs like the kidneys and lungs, it can rarely present with symptoms resembling GCA, and should be considered, particularly if the histological findings, such as the presence of fibrinoid necrosis, suggest this possibility.
- In order to establish a definitive diagnosis of leukocytoclastic vasculitis (LCV), histopathological confirmation through a skin biopsy is essential to differentiate LCV from other similar conditions. Histopathologically, LCV is defined by the following key features:
1. Neutrophilic infiltration in and around the vessel wall with leukocytoclasia.
2. Fibrinoid necrosis.
3. Vessel wall and tissue damage.

The lack of fibrinoid necrosis and inflammatory infiltration in the vessel may preclude the diagnosis of classic LCV, and necessitates further evaluation. However, these histological features tend to progress gradually over time, and a biopsy taken too early or too late might miss the "textbook" full-blown changes of LCV.

=== Prognostic value ===
Fibrinoid necrosis is included in the modified National Institutes of Health (NIH) activity index for lupus nephritis (LN), which is a scoring system used to assess the severity of LN based on histopathologic findings from kidney biopsies.

The activity index is based on the evaluation of six histologic features that indicate active inflammation, each of which is assigned a score from 0-3 depending on the degree of glomerular involvement. The score of fibrinoid necrosis and cellular/fibrocellular crescents is multiplied by two, because these two lesions were considered to be associated with a higher level of severity; this gives the activity index a total score of 0-24. (Note: This figure illustrates the modified NIH activity and chronicity indices for lupus nephritis.)

The activity index correlates with the level of active inflammation in LN, and serves as a general framework for guiding treatment decisions; the higher the NIH activity score, the more intensive the immunosuppressive treatment required.

== Treatment ==
Fibrinoid changes are generally irreversible once the architecture of the blood vessels is disrupted, and they cannot be ameliorated or reversed by immunosuppressive or anti-inflammatory drugs. Management is therefore directed towards the treatment of the underlying etiology in order to halt the progression of vascular damage and prevent the development of further fibrinoid lesions in previously unaffected vessels.

For instance, experimental studies involving rabbit models with induced acute serum sickness demonstrated that methylprednisolone inhibited the initial development of fibrinoid necrosis. This may be attributed to the ability of corticosteroids to suppress numerous inflammatory mediators, including complement and neutrophils. This prevents vascular damage caused by these mediators, and the subsequent development of fibrinoid lesions.
