= Weathering nodule of ear =

Cutaneous condition

Weathering nodules of ear is a cutaneous condition seen on the helices of the ears of Caucasian men who have a history of significant cumulative sun exposure.

== See also ==
- Zirconium granuloma
- List of cutaneous conditions
- Skin lesion
