= List of side effects of bupropion =

List of side effects of bupropion.

== Very common (>10%) ==
- Headache
- Transient insomnia

== Common (1–10%) ==
- Abdominal pain
- Agitation
- Anxiety
- Asthenia
- Concentration disturbance
- Constipation
- Depression
- Dizziness
- Dry mouth
- Fever
- Nausea
- Pruritus (itchiness)
- Rash
- Sweating
- Taste disorders
- Tremor
- Urticaria (indicative of a hypersensitivity reaction)
- Visual disturbance
- Vomiting

== Uncommon (0.1–1%) ==
- Anorexia
- Chest pain
- Confusion
- Alopecia
- Flushing
- Increased blood pressure
- Tachycardia (high heart rate)
- Tinnitus

== Rare (0.01–0.1%) ==
- Abnormal dreams
- Aggression
- Anaphylactic shock
- Angioedema (indicative of a hypersensitivity reaction)
- Arthralgia
- Ataxia
- Blood glucose disturbances
- Bronchospasm (indicative of a hypersensitivity reaction)
- Delusions
- Depersonalization
- Dyspnoea (indicative of a hypersensitivity reaction)
- Dystonia
- Elevated liver enzymes
- Erythema multiforme
- Hallucinations
- Hepatitis
- Hostility
- Hypotension
- Irritability
- Jaundice
- Malaise
- Memory impairment
- Myalgia
- Orthostatic hypotension
- Palpitations
- Paraesthesia
- Paranoid ideation
- Parkinsonism
- Restlessness
- Seizures
- A condition similar to serum sickness
- Stevens Johnson syndrome
- Syncope
- Twitching
- Urinary frequency
- Urinary retention
- Vasodilation
