= Vasa nervorum =

Small arteries providing blood supply to peripheral nerves

Vasa nervorum are small arteries that provide blood supply to peripheral nerves, specifically to the interior parts of nerves, and their coverings.

== Associated pathologic conditions ==
Small vessels like vasa vasorum and vasa nervorum are particularly susceptible to external mechanical compression. A decrease in blood flow through the vasa nervorum has been implicated in the development of diabetic neuropathy. Arteritis of the vasa nervorum leads to mononeuritis multiplex or polyneuropathy. Occlusion of vasa nervorum at the level of the epineurial arterioles leads to ischemia of nerves, leading to vasculitic neuropathy. and has been implicated as the cause in a few cases of facial nerve paralysis. During invasive diagnostic or therapeutic procedures, injecting a vasoconstrictor close to a nerve can reduce perfusion to its supplying vessel, risking ischemic nerve injury.
