= Arthus reaction =

- Other names: Arthus phenomenon
- Specialty: Immunology
- Symptoms: pain, swelling, induration, edema (vasculitis)
- Complications: necrosis, ulceration
- Usual onset: 2–12 h
- Duration: less than a week
- Causes: re-injection of an antigen into an animal that already has antibodies against it: vaccines, biologic drugs, insect bites, etc.
- Risk factors: previous Arthus reaction to the same antigen
- Treatment: resolves spontaneously
- Medication: antihistamines
- Prognosis: good
- Frequency: 0.003 cases per million doses (China)
- Named after: Nicolas Maurice Arthus

In immunology, the Arthus reaction (/ˌɑːrˈtjuːs/) is a type of local type III hypersensitivity reaction. Type III hypersensitivity reactions are immune complex-mediated, and involve the deposition of antigen/antibody complexes mainly in the vascular walls, serosa (pleura, pericardium, synovium), and glomeruli. This reaction is usually encountered in experimental settings following the injection of antigens that an animal has already developed antibodies against. It rarely happens in humans.

== History ==
The Arthus reaction was discovered by Nicolas Maurice Arthus in 1903. Arthus repeatedly injected horse serum subcutaneously into rabbits. After four injections, he found that there was edema and that the serum was absorbed slowly. Further injections resulted in stronger reactions with faster onset: the fifth resulted in a longer-lasting edema and more severe infiltration, the sixth the formation of a sterile thick white mass that lasted weeks, and on the seventh a rapid reddening followed by blanching and drying, ending with a gangrenous plaque. The rest of the animal remained healthy.

== Process ==
The Arthus reaction involves the in situ formation of antigen/antibody complexes after the intradermal injection of an antigen. If the individual has circulating antibody either from passive immunity or because of prior encounter with the antigen, an Arthus reaction may occur. Typical of most mechanisms of the type III hypersensitivity, Arthus manifests as local vasculitis due to deposition of IgG-based immune complexes in dermal blood vessels. The pathogenesis of the Arthus reaction is often erroneously described to be the result of complement activation, which subsequently results in neutrophil infiltration along with the other hallmarks of inflammation. However, complement in and of itself likely has a minor role in the actual process of the Arthus reaction and other type III hypersensitivities. Specifically, mice lacking the common gamma chain subunit of the Fc receptors that is required for signaling by CD64 (FcγRI) and CD16A (FcγRIIIA) as well as FcεRI have a drastic reduction in their Arthus reaction severity. Furthermore, mice with intact Fc signaling whose complement is depleted through the use of cobra venom have only a minor reduction in their Arthus reaction scores. The reaction as a whole is driven by mast cell degranulation. Subsequent investigation demonstrated that complement, specifically the anaphylatoxin C5a, can drive the Arthus reaction indirectly because the resultant signaling alters the ratio of activating to inhibitory Fc receptors on effector cells.

The vasculitis caused by the immune process renders the blood vessels leaky and fragile, which leads to the edema, induration, erythema, and petechiae. The vessels may develop fibrinoid necrosis and clots, which reduces blood flow (local ischemi), leading to central blanching, even rarely tissue necrosis.

Most symptoms begin 2–12 h after antigen exposure and gradually develop over a few hours. Most cases last a day or so, and almost all resolve with in one week without sequelae.

== Triggers ==
Arthus reactions can be triggered by injection of any foreign substance that the body has already made antibodies against. In medicine two common reasons for this kind of repeated exposure are vaccine booster shots (where the whole point is to re-trigger the immune response) and repeated doses of an antiserum of non-human origin (the body may develop antibodies against non-human serum, but one dose may not be enough). Additional triggers include other biologic drugs such as insulin and insect bites.

Arthus reactions have been infrequently reported after vaccinations containing diphtheria and tetanus toxoid. The CDC's description:

Arthus reactions (type III hypersensitivity reactions) are rarely reported after vaccination and can occur after tetanus toxoid–containing or diphtheria toxoid–containing vaccines. An Arthus reaction is a local vasculitis associated with deposition of immune complexes and activation of complement. Immune complexes form in the setting of high local concentration of vaccine antigens and high circulating antibody concentration. Arthus reactions are characterized by severe pain, swelling, induration, edema, hemorrhage, and occasionally by necrosis. These symptoms and signs usually occur 4–12 hours after vaccination. ACIP has recommended that persons who experienced an Arthus reaction after a dose of tetanus toxoid–containing vaccine should not receive Td more frequently than every 10 years, even for tetanus prophylaxis as part of wound management.

== Treatment ==
Most mild cases resolve on their own. Severe cases can be treated with anti-allergy medication (antihistamines). The most severe cases (with tissue necrosis) are treated with a glucocorticoid such as cortisone. In addition, cold compresses, acetaminophen, and limb elevation may improve symptoms.

== Risk factors ==
Higher circulating antibody levels and large vaccine dosages could render the Arthus reaction more likely. However, the reaction is so rare that antibody titer screening would likely cost too much for very little benefit.

People who have previously experienced an Arthus reaction with the same antigen are believed to be more at risk. These people should stretch out their booster shot schedules, for example to a maximum of one dose per 10 years for tetanus toxoid, including in wound management, per the Advisory Committee on Immunization Practices. Unnecessary re-exposure are to be avoided: for example, if someone who has had a reaction with a diphtheria toxoid-containing vaccine before, wound management should use pure tetanus toxoid instead of Tdap.

The maternal antibodies are probably responsible for when Arthus reaction occurs at the initial dose in the primary infant series in a child under 6 months. To avoid further reaction, subsequent shots should wait for the 6-month mark as maternal antibodies would be much lower by then.

== See also ==
- Serum sickness
