= Zirconium lactate =

Names
- Other names Zirconium(IV) lactate

Identifiers
CAS Number	60676-90-6
3D model (JSmol)	Interactive image
ChemSpider	2308157
PubChem CID	3045418
UNII	O406GR7I3X
CompTox Dashboard (EPA)	DTXSID00976110
- InChI: InChI=1S/4C3H5O3.Zr/c4*1-2(4)3(5)6;/h4*2H,1H3,(H,5,6);/q4*-1;+4 Key: JVIFSUQNYWNEHY-UHFFFAOYSA-N; InChI=1/4C3H5O3.Zr/c4*1-2(4)3(5)6;/h4*2H,1H3,(H,5,6);/q4*-1;+4 Key: JVIFSUQNYWNEHY-UHFFFAOYAJ
- SMILES: [Zr+4].O=C(O)C([O-])C.[O-]C(C(=O)O)C.[O-]C(C(=O)O)C.[O-]C(C(=O)O)C

Properties
Chemical formula	C_{12}H_{20}O_{12}Zr
Molar mass	447.504 g·mol^{−1}
- Except where otherwise noted, data are given for materials in their standard state (at 25 °C [77 °F], 100 kPa). verify (what is ?) Infobox references

Zirconium lactate is the zirconium salt of lactic acid. It is used in some deodorants. Zirconium carboxylates adopt highly complex structures and are heterogeneous compositions with the approximate formula Zr(OH)_{4-n}(O_{2}CCHOHCH_{3})_{n}(H_{2}O)_{x} where 1 < n < 3.

== Uses ==
It is also used in the petroleum industry as a cross-linking agent to prepare gels for fracturing fluids, fluids which are pumped into an oil-bearing rock formation to cause cracks in the rock and so to allow the oil to be extracted. It may be prepared by treating zirconium oxide with lactic acid.

== Physical properties ==
It is a colourless solid.

== Safety ==
Its LD_{50} >10 g/kg). It is suspected of causing zirconium granulomas (a form of skin irritation) in a small number of users.
