= Arteritis =

- Artery (normal)
- Specialty: Rheumatology

Arteritis is a vascular disorder characterized by inflammation of the walls of arteries, usually as a result of infection or autoimmune responses. Arteritis, a complex disorder, is still not entirely understood. Arteritis may be distinguished by its different types, based on the organ systems affected by the disease. A complication of arteritis is thrombosis, which can be fatal. Arteritis and phlebitis are forms of vasculitis.

== Signs and symptoms ==
Signs of general arteritis may include:

- Inflammation
- Fever
- Increased production of red blood cells (erythrocytes)
- Limping
- Reduced pulse

== Diagnosis ==
Diagnosis of arteritis is based on unusual medical symptoms. Similar symptoms may be caused by a number of other conditions, such as Ehlers–Danlos syndrome and Marfan syndrome (both heritable disorders of connective tissue), tuberculosis, syphilis, spondyloarthropathies, Cogans' syndrome, Buerger's, Behcet's, and Kawasaki disease. Various imaging techniques may be used to diagnose and monitor disease progression. Imaging modalities may include direct angiography, magnetic resonance angiography, and ultrasonography.

Angiography is commonly used in the diagnosis of Takayasu arteritis, especially in the advanced stages of the disease, when arterial stenosis, occlusion, and aneurysms may be observed. However, angiography is a relatively invasive investigation, exposing patients to large doses of radiation, so is not recommended for routine, long-term monitoring of disease progression in patients with Takayasu arteritis.

Computed tomography angiography can determine the size of the aorta and its surrounding branches, and can identify vessel wall lesions in middle to late stages of arteritis. CTA can also show the blood flow within the blood vessels. Like angiography, CTA exposes patients to high dosages of radiation.

Magnetic resonance angiography is used to diagnose Takayasu arteritis in the early stages, showing changes such as the thickening of the vessel wall. Even small changes may be measured, making MRA a useful tool for monitoring disease progression without exposing patients to the radiation of direct angiography or CTA. MRA is an expensive investigation, and shows calcification of the aorta and distal branches less clearly than other imaging methods.

Ultrasonography is an ideal method of diagnosing patients in early stages of arteritis when inflammation in the vessel walls occurs. It can also show the blood flow within the blood vessels. Ultrasonography is a popular first-line investigation for diagnosis because it is relatively quick, cheap, noninvasive, and does not expose patients to radiation. It is also used for long-term monitoring of disease progression in Takayasu arteritis. Not all vascular lesions are visible on ultrasound, and the accuracy of the scan depends, to some extent, on the person reading the scan, as the results are observed in real time.

=== Types ===
Arteritis may be primary or secondary to some other disease process. The primary types are:

Comparison of major types of arteritis
| Arteritis | Affected organs | Histopathology |
|---|---|---|
| Takayasu arteritis | Large vessels, including aorta and arch branches | Histiocytes, giant cells |
| Giant cell arteritis, also often called temporal arteritis (although they differ slightly) | Superficial temporal artery, other medium- and large-sized vessels, e.g. those supplying the head, eyes and optic nerves | Lymphocytes, macrophages, and multinucleated giant cells |
| Polyarteritis nodosa | Medium-sized vessels, CNS, PNS damage, kidneys, gastrointestinal tract, skeletal muscle, heart | Neutrophils, fibrinoid necrosis |

An example of a secondary arteritis is arteritis caused by infection with the fungal pathogen Candida albicans.

==== Giant cell arteritis ====
Giant cell arteritis contains two different types of arteritides that are almost indistinguishable from one another. It includes two types, temporal arteritis and Takayasu arteritis. Both types contain an occupancy of medium- and larger-sized arteries which are categorized based on the infiltration of the giant cells.

==== Takayasu arteritis ====
This type of arteritis is most common in females, with a median age of 25 years. Takayasu arteritis is more common in women of Asian descent who are in their reproductive years. However, over the past decades, its incidence in Africa, Europe, and North America has been increasing. Takayasu arteritis is an inflammatory disease that mainly affects the larger vessels such as the aorta and its surrounding branches. Research focused on Takayasu arteritis in the western parts of the world remains limited. An estimation suggests that, each year, the number of cases per million people is 2.6.

==== Temporal arteritis ====
Temporal arteritis, the second type of giant cell arteritis, is also a chronic, inflammatory disease involving mid- to large-sized arteries. Temporal arteritis has a higher incidence in people of Scandinavian descent. However, the incidence rate differs based on population, region and races. Temporal arteritis is not uncommon in North America. The incidence rate is around 0.017% for individuals over 50 years of age.

Symptoms of temporal arteritis are classified as specific and nonspecific.

Nonspecific symptoms:

- Headache
- Low grade fever
- Sweating
- Anorexia (loss of appetite)
- Weight loss
- General malaise

Specific symptoms:

- Claudication of the jaw
- Engorged, tender vessels

Specific symptoms usually develop in the advanced stages of temporal arteritis. These symptoms can include damage to eyesight and sudden blindness in one or both eyes.

Polyarteritis nodosa of unknown mechanism can cause testicular pain. It is often associated with aneurysms and Hepatitis B.

== Treatment ==
=== Medications ===
The first-line treatment for arteritis is oral glucocorticoid (steroid) medication, such as prednisone, taken daily for a period of three months. After this initial phase, the medication may be reduced in dose or frequency, e.g. every other day, if possible. If the disease worsens with the new treatment schedule, a cytotoxic medication may be given, in addition to the glucocorticoid. Commonly used cytotoxic agents include azathioprine, methotrexate, or cyclophosphamide. The dose of glucocorticoid medication may be decreased if response to treatment is good. This medication may be reduced gradually once the disease becomes inactive, slowly tapering the dose (to allow the body time to adjust) until the medication may be stopped completely. Conversely, if the disease remains active, the medication will need to be increased. After six months, if the medication cannot be reduced in frequency to alternate days, or if in 12 months the medications cannot be stopped completely, then treatment is deemed to have failed.

Pulsed therapy is an alternative method of administering the medications above, using much higher doses over a short period of time (a pulse), to reduce the inflammation within the arteries. Methylprednisolone, a glucocorticoid, is often used for pulse therapy; cyclophosphamide is an alternative. This method has been shown to be successful for some patients. Immunosuppressive pulse therapy, such as with cyclophosphamide, has also demonstrated relief of symptoms associated with arteritis.
