= Urticarial dermatoses =

Skin condition

Urticarial dermatoses are dermatoses (skin conditions) that produce longer-term urticaria (itching).

Not all urticaria is an urticarial dermatosis. With urticarial dermatoses, the individual lesions last for days or longer.

== Examples ==
- Drug-induced urticaria
- Eosinophilic cellulitis
- Bullous pemphigoid
- Urticarial vasculitis
- Schnitzler syndrome
- NLRP3-associated autoinflammatory disease (NLRP3-AID)
- NLRP12-associated autoinflammatory disease (NLRP12-AID)
- PLAID syndrome
- FCAS4

== See also ==
- Urticaria
- List of cutaneous conditions
