= Localized heat contact urticaria =

- Specialty: Dermatology

Localized heat contact urticaria is a cutaneous condition, one of the rarest forms of urticaria, where within minutes of contact with heat from any source, itching and wheals occur at the precise site of contact, lasting up to 1 hour.

== See also ==
- Drug-induced urticaria
- List of cutaneous conditions
