= Hypersensitivity =

Overreaction of the immune system to an antigen

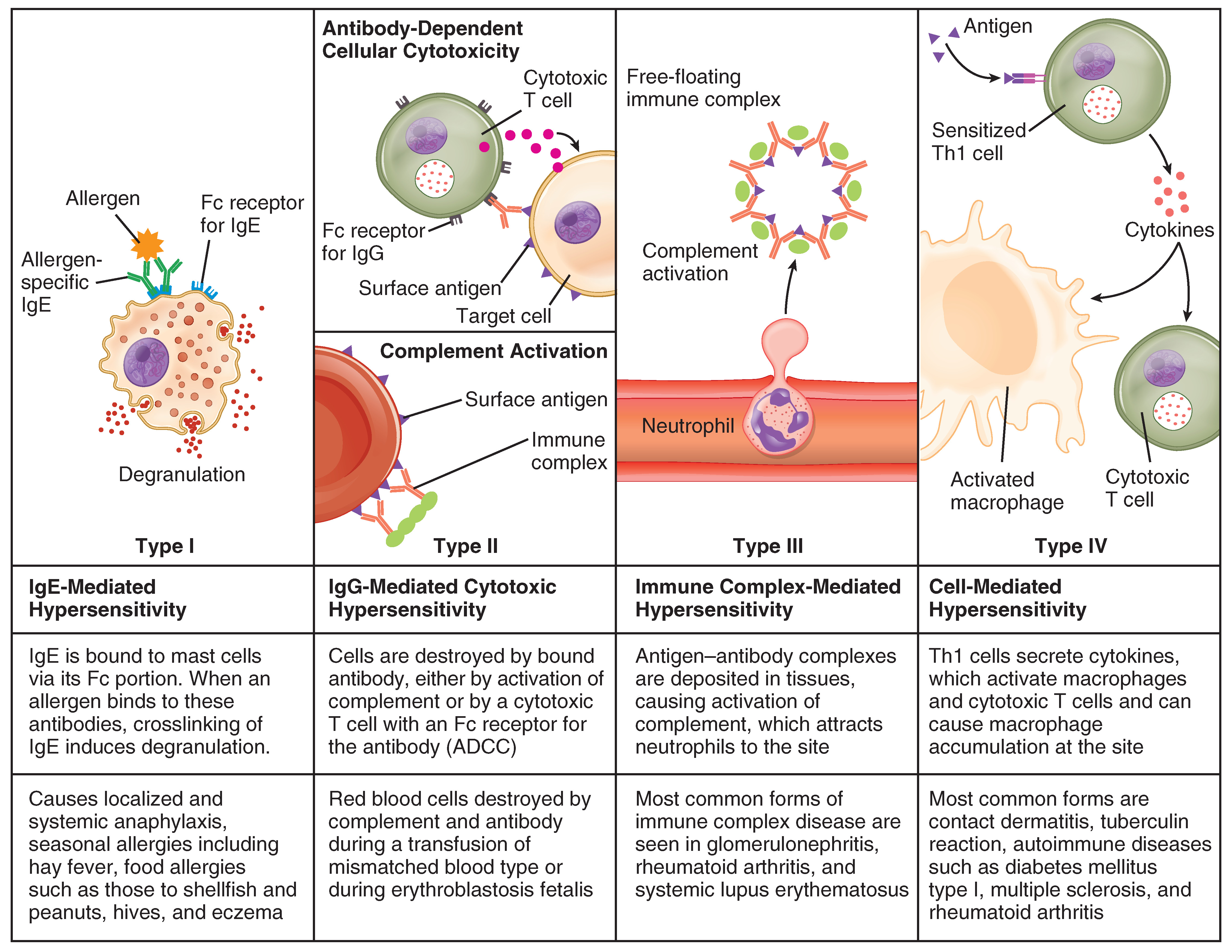
- Types of hypersensitivity reactions
- Specialty: Immunology

Hypersensitivity (also called hypersensitivity reaction) is an immune response characterized by mechanisms that cause significant tissue damage or physiological dysfunction, whether directed against pathogens, harmless environmental antigens, or self-antigens that is reproducible upon re-exposure to the antigen. While hypersensitivity mechanisms can sometimes serve protective functions (such as control of infectious diseases), they are distinguished by their capacity to cause collateral tissue damage that may exceed any protective benefit. Collectively, hypersensitivities are extremely common: hay fever affects about 1 in 10 people worldwide, asthma affects hundreds of millions, and about 1 in 12 people have an autoimmune disease.

In 1963, Philip George Houthem Gell and Robin Coombs introduced a systematic classification of the different types of hypersensitivity based on the types of antigens and immune responses involved. According to this system, known as the Gell and Coombs classification or Gell-Coombs's classification, there are four types of hypersensitivity:

1. Type I, which is an Immunoglobulin E (IgE)-mediated immediate reaction. (Known as allergies)
2. Type II, an antibody-mediated reaction canonically involving IgG, IgM, or both.
3. Type III, an immune complex-mediated reaction involving IgG, complement system and phagocytes.
4. Type IV, a T cell-mediated, delayed hypersensitivity reaction.

In addition to their different mechanisms, each one differs in the time to symptoms following exposure to the offending antigen. Type I hypersensitivity is also known as immediate hypersensitivity because it occurs within seconds to minutes of exposure. Type II (cytotoxic) and type III (immune complex) occur within hours of exposure. Type IV is also known as delayed-type hypersensitivity (DTH) and occurs days after exposure.

Note: The Gell-Coombs classification of hypersensitivities (as well as the other ones discussed on this page) does not correspond to the modern classification of immune responses as type 1, type 2, or type 3. Type I hypersensitivities, for example, are inappropriate manifestations of type 2 immune responses (IgE, IL-4, IL-13-driven). Type IV are type 1 immune responses (IFN-γ, Th1, CD8 T cell-driven), when considering the original Gell-Coombs classification system. Type II and III can involve a mixture of different immune response types.

Autoimmune diseases manifest as some form of type II, III, or IV hypersensitivity reaction as their key pathological process. It is possible to have multiple types of hypersensitivity reaction contribute to a disease at the same time, and the type of hypersensitivity reaction central to a given immunological disease can change over time (for example, acute hypersensitivity pneumonitis is thought to be a type III hypersensitivity, but as it becomes more chronic, it begins to become resemble type IV more), or even by region (allergic asthma behaves like a type IV hypersensitivity in the lower airways and like a type I hypersensitivity in the upper respiratory tract). Thus, these categories are best viewed as guides rather than absolute rules.

An understanding of hypersensitivity reactions is important in guiding diagnostic and treatment decisions for the conditions that are mediated by them.

== Terminology ==
The term "allergy" has undergone significant revision over the years, originally referring specifically to type I hypersensitivities (i.e., an IgE-mediated process). However, modern professional societies define allergy to be any immunologic mechanism (whether IgE-mediated or not) that produces a hypersensitivity reaction. This has some use because some things often described as allergies or allergic diseases (e.g., nickel allergy, FPIES) are not type I hypersensitivity reactions. However, this means that anything under the Gell and Coombs classification can be considered an allergy, so long as the antigen being targeted by the hypersensitivity originates from outside the body (i.e., not autoimmune diseases). There are also non-immune hypersensitivity reactions included in classifications under more modern frameworks (type V, VI, and VII hypersensitivity under EAACI 2023 position paper classification, see below), which are not covered under Gell and Coombs's classification. These represent non-allergic hypersensitivity reactions. Despite this, many still use the term allergy specifically to describe type I hypersensitivity reactions, so it is best to obtain clarification whenever possible. Confusingly, the term "allergen" has not been updated to reflect this change in usage, and specifically refers to any antigen bound by IgE.

== Gell and Coombs classification ==
The Gell and Coombs classification of hypersensitivity is the most widely used, and distinguishes four types of immune response that result in bystander tissue damage on the basis of their mechanism.

Gell and Coombs Hypersensitivity Reactions Classification
| Type | Alternative names | Antibodies or Cell Mediators | Immunologic Reaction | Timing | Clinical Examples (some conditions involve multiple types of hypersensitivity reactions simultaneously) |
|---|---|---|---|---|---|
| I | Immediate | IgE, mast cells | Before a type I hypersensitivity reaction may occur, sensitization is required to produce antigen (allergen)-specific IgE.: 1. Secreted IgE binds to the high-affinity IgE receptor on the surface of mast cells, basophils, and potentially eosinophils. IgE is predominantly bound to the surface of mast cells because of the strength of the association (K_{D} ≈ 10^{−10} M), and levels in the circulation are minimal.; 2. Allergen is bound by membrane-bound IgE.; 3. IgE-allergen complex is sensed by mast cells, basophils, and eosinophils.; 4. Mast cells (as well as basophils) degranulate, liberating key vasoactive mediators such as histamine, leukotrienes, as well as tryptase, platelet-activating factor, and heparin (among other substances). Mast cells are the principal tissue effector cells in type I reactions. | Rapidly upon exposure to the allergen (seconds to minutes, typically). | allergic rhinitis; food allergy; urticaria/angioedema; venom allergy; drug allergy; IgE-mediated anaphylaxis; α-gal syndrome (delayed onset of symptoms relative to exposure) |
| II | Antibody-dependent; Cytotoxic | IgG, IgM, complement, FcγRs, phagocytes, NK cells | Type II reactions are formed against cell surface or matrix antigens.: 1. Surface-bound antigen is recognized by pre-formed IgG or IgM antibodies.; 2. Classical pathway of complement activation is initiated on the surface of the cell.; 3. Complement activation produces opsonins that can be recognized by complement receptor-expressing phagocytes.; 4. Membrane attack complex forms a pore in the cell.; 5. Antibody-dependent cellular cytotoxicity may occur via FcγR-dependent mechanisms.; In some cases, the antibody may have an agonistic function, as in Graves disease, in which antibodies target and activate the TSH receptor, inducing hyperthyroidism. Otherwise, the antibodies may exert a blocking function, as in myasthenia gravis, in which antibodies against the acetylcholine receptor (AchR) or muscle-specific kinase (MusK) prevent interactions with their target ligand. | Hours–days after re-exposure. | Autoimmune hemolytic anemia; Rheumatic heart disease; Erythroblastosis fetalis; Goodpasture's syndrome; Graves' disease (agonistic antibodies); Myasthenia gravis (blocking antibodies); Pemphigus vulgaris; Drug-induced cytopenia |
| III | Immune complex | Immune complexes (IgG, IgA, IgM), complement, FcγRs | Type III hypersensitivities occur in response to soluble antigens.: 1. Antigen–antibody complexes form in excess and deposit in vessel walls and other tissues e.g., the synovium.; 2. Complement activation generates anaphylatoxins that recruit and activate neutrophils.; 3. Neutrophil enzymes and ROS cause vasculitis and tissue injury.; Type III is distinguished from type II also on the basis of the fact that it is driven by immune complex deposition, whereas type II hypersensitivity does not depend on the deposition of immune complexes. | Hours to days after re-exposure. | Serum sickness; Arthus reaction; Post streptococcal glomerulonephritis; Membranous nephropathy; Reactive arthritis; Lupus nephritis; Systemic lupus erythematosus; Hypersensitivity pneumonitis |
| IV | Delayed | T-cells; Cytotoxic T cells (CTLs); T helper cells | CTLs and T helper cells are activated by an antigen presenting cell. When the antigen is presented again in the future, the memory T cells will be activated and cause an inflammatory response mediated by the effector cells activated by the T cells (e.g., CTLs, neutrophils, macrophages, eosinophils) and the cytokines produced. The classical version of type IV hypersensitivity is demonstrated with the tuberculin skin test, which is a Th1-driven reaction. In modernized versions of the Gell and Coombs framework, there are 4 subtypes of type IV hypersensitivity which are driven by type 1 immune responses (IVa), type 2 immune responses (IVb), cytotoxicity (IVc), and type 3 immune responses (IVd). | Delayed; peaks ~48–72 hours after re-exposure. | Contact dermatitis; Mantoux test; Chronic transplant rejection; Coeliac disease; Hashimoto's thyroiditis; Granuloma annulare |

These are elaborated upon in greater depth below in their respective sections.

=== Classifications beyond Gell & Coombs ===
Note: The numerals used between the two frameworks presented below (EAACI 2023 and Pichler) overlap, but are not identical i.e., IVc in EAACI is not the same as IVc under Pichler's classification.

==== EAACI Proposed Categorization of Hypersensitivity reactions ====
Over time, additional types of hypersensitivity reactions have been defined beyond the 4 proposed by Gell and Coombs. Per the most recent classification published by European Academy of Allergy and Clinical Immunology in 2023 in their position paper, hypersensitivities are classified as per the table below (type I-III are the same as in the Gell and Coombs classification, type IV is expanded, and types V-VII are new). Note that type IV hypersensitivities in this framework are not exactly the same as those in modernized Gell and Coombs' taxonomy. The table below details the additional and expanded types. EAACI 2023 groups type I-III hypersensitivities as antibody-mediated.

EAACI 2023 Hypersensitivity Reaction Classifications
| Group | Class | Critical Mediators | Mechanism | Timing | Clinical Examples (some conditions involve multiple types of hypersensitivity reactions simultaneously) |
|---|---|---|---|---|---|
| Cell-mediated | Type IVa (cell-mediated, type 1) | Th1 cells, IFN-γ, activated macrophages | 1. Antigen is presented to memory Th1/Tc1 cells.; 2. These cells release IFN-γ and related mediators that activate macrophages.; 3. Local induration and, with persistence, granuloma-type pathology develops. | Delayed; peaks ~48–72 h. | Tuberculin skin test; chronic phase of hypersensitivity pneumonitis; celiac disease; some contact dermatitis patterns; non-type 2 endotypes of asthma |
| Cell-mediated | Type IVb (cell-mediated, type 2) | Th2 cells, IL-4, IL-5, IL-13, eosinophils | 1. Antigen presentation favors Th2 responses.; 2. Th2 cytokines recruit and activate eosinophils and can drive IgE class switching.; 3. Eosinophil-rich inflammation leads to tissue symptoms and chronicity.; There is significant overlap between type IVa hypersensitivity and type I hypersensitivity in terms of the mechanisms and players involved. The major distinctions lie in timing and the predominant role of eosinophilic inflammation via IL-5 in type IVb but not type I hypersensitivity reactions. The synthesis of IgE occurs at the end stage of type IVb hypersensitivity, whereas it is a prerequisite for type I hypersensitivity to occur. However, specific reactions may include features of both e.g., acute bronchospasm in asthma is often type I, but the chronic phase with eosinophilia and persistent inflammation via Th2s and ILC2s is more similar to type IVb. Type IVb hypersensitivity can also induce dysfunction of the epithelial barrier as in type V hypersensitivity. | Usually days–weeks; often chronic relapsing. | Atopic dermatitis endotypes; asthma/CRS T2 endotypes; eosinophilic esophagitis; DRESS |
| Cell-mediated | Type IVc (cell-mediated, type 3) | T-cell–derived chemokines (e.g., CXCL8/IL-8), GM-CSF, neutrophils | 1. Antigen presentation elicits Th17/Tc17 responses.; 2. IL-17–family signals recruit and activate neutrophils and local innate pathways.; 3. Neutrophil enzymes and extracellular traps contribute to epithelial injury. | Delayed; typically days (drug-related patterns accelerate on re-challenge). | Neutrophilic asthma endotypes; neutrophil-predominant dermatitis variants. Note: some drug eruptions historically labeled "Type IVd" in other taxonomies are included here in the EAACI scheme. |
| Tissue-driven mechanisms | Type V (epithelial) | Epithelial barrier defects, TSLP, IL-33, IL-25, ILC2/Th2 pathways | 1. Barrier disruption increases allergen and microbe access.; 2. Epithelial signals activate downstream immune pathways and sustain inflammation.; 3. Chronic disease reflects ongoing barrier dysfunction with mixed immune features.; In type V hypersensitivity, immunological dysfunction occurs downstream of barrier dysfunction. Loss of barrier integrity itself induces recruitment of immune cells. For example, mutations in filaggrin predispose to multiple allergic diseases (most prominently atopic dermatitis) regardless of pre-existing atopy. Some immunologists contest whether this represents a distinct type of hypersensitivity or just a predisposing factor to hypersensitivity. | Chronic with exposure-triggered flares. | atopic dermatitis; allergic rhinitis; chronic rhinosinusitis with nasal polyps; asthma; eosinophilic esophagitis; celiac disease; protein-losing enteropathy |
| Tissue-driven mechanisms | Type VI (metabolic) | Adipokines (e.g., leptin), innate cytokines (e.g., IL-6, TNF-α), oxidative stress | 1. Obesity and related metabolic states create systemic low-grade inflammation.; 2. This milieu modifies airway/tissue immunity and disease endotypes.; 3. Severity and treatment response can be altered.; Note that this is not saying that obesity or metabolic disorders are themselves a hypersensitivity reaction, but rather that they produce conditions that induce type VI hypersensitivity (metaflammation). The EAACI regards type VI hypersensitivity more as a modifier of existing hypersensitivity reactions (for example, obese asthmatics are more likely to be corticosteroid-resistant than nonobese asthmatics, in part because the milieu pushes towards neutrophilic endotypes) rather than a distinct type of hypersensitivity. | Chronic; tracks with metabolic stress. | Obesity-associated asthma phenotypes and related airway disease |
| Direct response to chemicals | Type VII | cysteinyl-leukotrienes, mast cells | Multiple, depending on the substance in question. Classic examples: COX-1 inhibition results in enhanced production of cysteinyl-leukotrienes causing bronchoconstriction; Mast cells are activated directly by MRGPRX2ligands, ion channels, or other GPCR ligands independently of IgE | Minutes–hours. | AERD/N-ERD; Non-allergic hypersensitivity reaction (formerly known as pseudoallergy) |

The expansion reflects recognition that not all adverse immune reactions fit the original antibody/cell-mediated dichotomy, particularly chronic inflammatory conditions with complex pathophysiology.

==== Pichler Drug Hypersensitivity Classifications ====
Another classification that has seen use other than Gell and Coombs is that proposed by Pichler, mainly for drug hypersensitivities. This is an important update because drug hypersensitivities do not operate under the exact same rules as hypersensitivities to other substances. For example, drugs are often small molecules and are recognized only as haptens, hypersensitivity reactions to drugs don't always require prior sensitization (meaning they can occur from the first exposure), and host genetics/pharmacogenomics play an outsized role. It is broadly similar to the Gell and Coombs classification with some slight refinements in that it subdivides type IV into type IVa, IVb, IVc, and IVd, adds non-allergic hypersensitivity, and pharmacological interaction with immune receptor (p-i reaction). Those that differ from the Gell and Coombs classification are summarized below.

Pichler Additional Hypersensitivity Classification
| Type | Mechanism | Timing | Clinical Example |
|---|---|---|---|
| IVa (Th1/macrophage predominant) | 1. Drug (or haptenated self-peptide) is presented to Th1/Tc1 cells.; 2. IFN-γ and related mediators activate macrophages and cause induration.; 3. With persistence, a delayed-type pattern develops. | Delayed; peaks ~48–72 h (sometimes later). | Tuberculin skin test; some contact dermatitis patterns |
| IVb (Th2/eosinophil predominant) | 1. Antigen presentation biases a Th2 response.; 2. IL-4/IL-5/IL-13 recruit eosinophils and can promote IgE class switching.; 3. Eosinophil-rich inflammation produces edema and systemic findings (e.g., eosinophilia). | Usually days–weeks; often prolonged or relapsing. | Morbilliform/maculopapular exanthema; DRESS (2–6 wk after start). |
| IVc (cytotoxic T cell predominant) | 1. Drug-specific CD8⁺ T cells recognize drug-modified peptide–HLA or drug–HLA/TCR complexes.; 2. Perforin/granzyme and granulysin induce keratinocyte apoptosis/necrosis.; 3. Epidermal injury can become widespread. | Typically 1–3 wk after first course; faster on re-exposure | Stevens-Johnson Syndrome/Toxic Epidermal Necrolysis |
| IVd (Th17/neutrophil predominant) | 1. Drug-specific T cells produce chemokines (e.g., CXCL8) and GM-CSF.; 2. Recruited neutrophils release enzymes and extracellular traps.; 3. Sterile pustules and epithelial injury result, resolving after withdrawal. | Delayed; often 24–72 h; accelerates on re-challenge. | Acute generalized exanthematous pustulosis (AGEP); neutrophil-predominant drug dermatitis variants. |
| p-i (pharmacological interaction with immune receptor) | 1. Without covalent haptenation, the drug binds reversibly to HLA and/or the T-cell receptor and directly activates T cells.; 2. Reactions can occur on the first course.; 3. Strong HLA associations reflect structural binding requirements. | Days–weeks on first course; can be rapid; faster on re-exposure. | Abacavir hypersensitivity (HLA-B57:01); carbamazepine SJS/TEN (HLA-B15:02 in many Asian populations); allopurinol SCAR (HLA-B*58:01). |
| non-allergic hypersensitivity reaction | Multiple mechanisms: MRGPRX2-mediated direct mast-cell activation causes immediate mediator release without IgE.; COX-1 inhibition skews arachidonic metabolism toward cysteinyl-leukotrienes, provoking bronchoconstriction and nasal/airway inflammation.; Complement activation–related pseudo-allergy (CARPA) generates C3a/C5a that activate leukocytes and mast cells.; Bradykinin-mediated angioedema (e.g., ACE inhibitors) reflects impaired bradykinin degradation.; Among others. | Minutes–hours (often on first exposure). | Vancomycin infusion syndrome (formerly called red man syndrome); AERD/N-ERD to NSAIDs; IV iron/liposomal drugs (CARPA); ACE-inhibitor angioedema (bradykinin). |

Importantly, there are additional classification schemes for adverse drug reactions, but these do not generally consider them in terms of hypersensitivity mechanisms.

These classification schemes are constantly being revised and updated across geographies and specialties.

== Type I hypersensitivity ==
Type I hypersensitivities are commonly described as allergies (see note in Terminology).

=== Pathogenesis ===
Type I hypersensitivity

The essential component of type I hypersensitivity is high-affinity antigen-specific immunoglobulin E (IgE). There are essentially no restrictions on what antigen IgE may be generated against (despite the need for class-switching, IgE against carbohydrate allergens has been observed, as well as against haptens), but common ones include various food allergens, latex, venoms, and medications. IgE accounts for a minority of all immunoglobulins produced, and, under physiological conditions, helps to mediate protection against parasites (those too large to get inside cells e.g., helminths, arthropods) as well as venoms. The mechanisms underlying the induction of IgE are not completely understood, but it is known that IgE can be produced either from class switching directly from an IgM antibody or through sequential class switching (in which an IgG antibody made from an IgM antibody class switches into IgE). The generation of an IgE antibody against an antigen is known as sensitization. This is much more likely to occur in atopic individuals. Sensitization on its own does not guarantee that a type I hypersensitivity reaction will occur.

Once the IgE has been generated, it binds primarily to mast cells via the high-affinity IgE receptor (FcεRI) expressed on mast cells and basophils. Mast cells reside in the tissues (the skin and the mucosae) whereas basophils are bloodborne. Only very small quantities of IgE are present in the sera and their half-life in sera is brief. However, when bound to mast cells as a complex with FcεRI, IgE can persist for weeks, independent of whether or not it is being actively produced by IgE-secreting cells.

The onset of symptoms from exposure occurs in seconds to minutes. Once the antigen (allergen) IgE is specific against makes contact with FcεRI-bound IgE, it induces an influx of calcium into the mast cell via ORAI1 that causes degranulation and releases the following mediators (functions listed are not comprehensive):

- Histamine - Causing enhanced vascular permeability, mucus secretion and bronchoconstriction.
- Heparin - Functions as an anticoagulant, binds mediators, and sequesters growth factors.
- Tryptase - Degrades allergens and cross-linked IgE, activates complement, degrades neuropeptides, and increases airway smooth muscle contractility.
- Chymase - Expression of chymase is mast cell subset-specific: it is present in human MC_{TC} (human tryptase and chymase-containing mast cells) and mouse CTMC (connective tissue mast cells). Chymase increases mucus secretion, activates IL-1β, and degrades extracellular matrix.

After this initial release of preformed mediators, mast cells begin to synthesize:

- PGD2 - Causing bronchoconstriction, tissue edema, increased mucus secretion, and chemotaxis of eosinophils, Th2 cells, and basophils via the CRTH2 (CD294) receptor.
- LTC4/LTD4 - Causing bronchoconstriction, tissue edema, increased mucus secretion, enhanced IL-13-dependent airway smooth muscle proliferation, eosinophil IL-4 secretion, mast cell IL-5, IL-8, and TNF-α secretion, and tissue fibrosis.

The role of platelet-activating factor (PAF) as an amplifier of mast cell responses has been increasingly recognized, particularly in anaphylaxis. The PAF may be produced directly by the mast cells themselves, but other sources are not excluded. While type I hypersensitivity reactions share these common pathomechanisms, distinct ones are also possible (for example, bradykinin contributes to anaphylaxis and angioedema, but is not prominent as a general feature of type I hypersensitivity reactions as a whole and is not a mast cell mediator). Many reactions also evolve a late phase (hours) characterized by recruited eosinophils and sustained mediator/cytokine production.

Hypersensitivity reactions mediated by IgE antibodies may occur upon first exposure to a substance when prior sensitization to homologous antigens from other sources has occurred; this cross-reactivity explains the onset of symptoms even without previous direct contact. However, most of the time, type I hypersensitivity reactions believed to be the result of a first exposure actually reflect an undetected prior exposure to the antigen that induced sensitization.

Note that scombroid food poisoning is not a type I hypersensitivity, but rather a direct histamine toxicity, as IgE is not involved.

=== Diagnosis ===
Type I hypersensitivities may be diagnosed through multiple modalities. For example, the gold-standard for food allergies is the double-blind placebo controlled food challenge (DBPCFC). The presence of IgE antibodies alone is never sufficient to demonstrate the existence of a type I hypersensitivity reaction. This must be paired with a clinical history supportive of the reaction, as it otherwise may reflect sensitization and trigger avoidance of an allergen that is not necessary, and, paradoxically, may lead to the development of type I hypersensitivity. This underscores the importance of appropriate supervision before attempting elimination diets. For medications, the equivalent of a DBPCFC is a graded dose provocation test. Otherwise, skin prick testing can also diagnose type I hypersensitivities, but reflects sensitization rather than true hypersensitivity and must be paired with a supportive clinical history. The basophil activation test is occasionally used as a complement to other testing, but it has important limitations that warrant consideration, including the potential for nonresponders and the inaccessibility. Component-resolved diagnostics allow for identification of the specific allergenic component of substances that triggers type I hypersensitivity, which can help inform treatment. Test choice and interpretation should follow pretest probability to minimize false positives and false negatives.

=== Management ===
Histamine is a central mediator of the symptoms observed in type I hypersensitivity reactions, and so treatment with antihistamines often provides effective symptomatic relief. Corticosteroids can also help to promote an immunoregulatory environment that helps suppress the inflammation associated with type I hypersensitivities. However, histamine is not the only mediator, nor is it necessarily the most important one. For instance, antihistamines neither prevent nor treat anaphylaxis, indicating a key role for other mediators (intramuscular epinephrine is the first-line treatment for anaphylaxis and it addresses all of its pathological manifestations). Premedication with antihistamines and corticosteroids to prevent type I hypersensitivity reactions is not shown to be effective and must not replace the prompt administration of epinephrine in the setting of anaphylaxis.

Additional targeted approaches for IgE-mediated disease include biologics that reduce IgE or type 2 inflammation. Anti-IgE monoclonal antibodies lower free IgE and down-regulate FcεRI on mast cells and basophils, decreasing effector cell sensitivity. Alternatively, blocking key type 2 cytokines such as IL-4 and IL-13 helps to control allergic inflammation. IL-5 blockade has also been used to eliminate eosinophils from the body to help control these inflammatory responses. In cases refractory to IL-4 and IL-13 blockade, upstream targeting of other cytokines like TSLP can be effective. Leukotriene-pathway inhibitors (cysteinyl-leukotriene receptor antagonists or 5-lipoxygenase inhibitors) are adjuncts for airway-predominant disease. For indispensable medications that elicit IgE-mediated reactions, rapid drug desensitization protocols can transiently induce mast-cell hyporesponsiveness, with protection persisting only while dosing continues. Despite the central role of mast cells in the pathogenesis of type I hypersensitivity, mast cell stabilizers are generally used only in mast cell activation syndromes (except for allergic conjunctivitis).

Type I hypersensitivity reactions are often amenable to desensitization (allergen immunotherapy). The basic principle of allergen immunotherapy involves exposing the patient to gradually escalating doses of allergen, sometimes with and sometimes without an adjuvant. The specific form of immunotherapy (e.g., sublingual vs subcutaneous) depends on the nature of the allergen as well as patient characteristics. As successive exposure to the allergen occurs, the patient begins to develop IgG1 and IgG4 antibodies that compete with IgE for binding and inhibit IgE signaling, as well as develop regulatory T cells that help to promote tolerance to the allergen. However, maintenance of tolerance often requires regular re-exposure to the allergen. It is also not unusual for type I hypersensitivities to fade over time, particularly in children. For example, most patients with genuine penicillin allergy lose their reactivity within 10 years. Nonetheless, some are persistent, particularly in the absence of desensitization therapy (such as peanut allergy).

Depending on the severity of the type I hypersensitivity, it may also be important to avoid exposure to the allergen completely, if possible. Repeated exposures to the allergen may lead to increases in IgE levels and more intense activation of mast cells and basophils. It is unclear why allergen immunotherapy is able to induce tolerance whereas re-exposure to the allergen under native conditions typically exacerbates type I hypersensitivity, but it is likely a combination of the route of exposure and dose of the allergen, as well as the overall immunological context through which it is encountered.

== Type II hypersensitivity ==
Type II hypersensitivity reaction refers to a reaction in which antibodies (classically IgG or IgM) are directed against cellular or extracellular matrix antigens with the resultant cellular destruction, functional loss, or damage to tissues. The antigens may occur normally within the body (intrinsic antigens) or may be introduced from the environment (extrinsic antigens).

Type II hypersensitivity

Physiological dysfunction occurs via some combination of:

- Altered receptor signaling due to antibody binding. The signaling may be enhanced by antibody binding (as in Graves's disease) or inhibited (as in myasthenia gravis).
- Activation of the complement system via the classical pathway, causing formation of the membrane attack complex, anaphylatoxin production, and opsonization.
- Fc-mediated effector functions (e.g., antibody-dependent cellular cytotoxicity, opsonization and phagocytosis, cytokine secretion, degranulation, reactive oxygen species production, increased expression of costimulatory ligands and MHC class II).

IgA may also play a role in type II hypersensitivity reactions as in linear IgA disease or IgA pemphigus, though it is not classically included in the definition of type II hypersensitivities.

The onset of symptoms following exposure is usually hours to days, but the conditions mediated by type II hypersensitivity are often chronic.

Type II hypersensitivities have multiple overlapping features with type III hypersensitivities. The principal distinctions lie in:

1. Where the immune complex forms:
  1. soluble phase corresponds to type III.
  2. matrix or membrane-bound corresponds to type II.
2. Where the tissue damage occurs:
  1. local to the antigen corresponds to type II.
  2. distally as in through deposition into the vasculature, glomeruli, or synovium, corresponds to type III.

Autoimmune hemolytic anemias are classic examples of type II hypersensitivities. In this case, antibodies cause lysis of red blood cells by binding to their surface and initiating the canonical type II hypersensitivity mechanisms. These can be diagnosed via the Coombs test. In the direct Coombs test, a patient's blood is taken and incubated with antihuman antibodies (the Coombs reagent). The result is positive (indicating binding of antibodies in the patient to red blood cells) when clumping of the red blood cells occurs. The indirect Coombs test is similar, but uses the serum of the donor rather than their whole blood and uses non-donor red blood cells with the Coombs reagent. As with the direct Coombs test, the result is positive when clumping of red blood cells occurs.

The management of type II hypersensitivities is heterogeneous and depends on the specific hypersensitivity.

== Type III hypersensitivity ==
Type III hypersensitivity

Type III hypersensitivities occur in response to soluble antigens. These antigens are recognized by antibodies and form lattices of antigen and antibody (sometimes incorporating complement) known as immune complexes. As these circulate, the immune complexes may become deposited in various tissues, wherein they mediate tissue damage through mechanisms that greatly overlap with type II hypersensitivity, though classically there is a greater emphasis on the role of neutrophils as drivers of inflammation in type III hypersensitivity. Textbooks often underemphasize the role of FcγR signaling in the clinical manifestations of type III hypersensitivities, instead focusing on complement. However, at least for the Arthus reaction, FcγR's appear to be much more important for disease than complement. Nonetheless, there is reciprocal regulation of these pathways as the expression of activating FcγRs is shown to be increased by C5a receptor signaling. Additionally, there are instances in which complement does appear to be key to the pathogenesis of type III hypersensitivity. For example, the first RSV vaccines attempted (which were never licensed), comprising formalin-inactivated RSV precipitated on alum, caused a heightened risk of hospitalization upon RSV infection in children (vaccine-associated enhanced respiratory disease, VAERD), in part through mechanisms that are consistent with type III hypersensitivity. However, complement deficiency is protective against VAERD. Similar findings have been reported with atypical measles syndrome, associated with measles infection following vaccination with the killed measles vaccine (which was withdrawn from market in 1968).

In general, type III reactions occur within a matter of hours of exposure to the antigen, unless it is the first exposure in which case there is a delay to formation of antibodies (as in serum sickness) to about 7–14 days post-exposure, with more rapid onset with successive re-exposures.

While there are assays that detect immune complexes, most hospitals do not have them and so their usefulness is limited. Complement levels can often provide a hint that type III hypersensitivity is occurring: a drop in C4 and C3 implies classical pathway activation, often associated with SLE. A drop in C3, factor B, or properdin suggests alternative pathway activation, often associated with membranoproliferative glomerulonephritis.

The management of type III hypersensitivities is heterogeneous and depends on the specific hypersensitivity.

=== Molecular mechanisms ===
The size of the immune complexes is an important determinant of the clinical manifestations of disease. Immune complex size depends on the amount and ratio of antibody to antigen, with the largest ones forming at intermediate quantities of both. Large immune complexes are more readily phagocytosed by Kupffer cells and red pulp macrophages, whereas small ones are more readily deposited into tissues. Immune complexes formed at moderate excess antigen levels (slightly more than the level that maximizes the size of complexes) are thought to be the most pathogenic because they are harder to clear than large complexes, remain in the circulation for longer, and can readily fix complement (which small immune complexes do not do as effectively). The glomerular and skin basement membranes' negative charge can promote deposition of positively charged immune complexes into these sites. In some cases, positively charged antigens may first deposit into the basement membrane of glomeruli before immune complexes form (though canonically in type III hypersensitivity immune complex formation happens first). Antigen and antibody structure are also key determinants of immune complex size. For example, immune complexes cannot form when the antibodies all bind the same exact epitope or overlapping epitopes, unless the epitope in question occurs multiple times on the surface of the antigen (as in a multivalent antigen). In an immune response, many different antibodies may be elicited by the same antigen and these may not overlap in their epitopes, making immune complex formation occur more readily. Antibody binding must be at least bivalent (i.e., both antibody paratopes have to be occupied) and antigen must be multivalent for there to be any possibility of immune complex formation. Rheumatoid factor can increase the size of immune complexes and often arises transiently in the course of immune responses, amplifying antibody signaling (it does not automatically indicate rheumatoid arthritis, though it is rarely found under basal conditions in healthy people).

The biological activity of immune complexes also depends on the antibody isotype and subclass. IgG4 for example is not as efficient at forming immune complexes because it readily undergoes Fab arm exchange and thus behaves as though it has only one binding site (functional monovalency), and is a poor activator of complement. In contrast, IgM is among the most potent activators of the classical pathway of complement activation of all the isotypes and readily forms immune complexes because it has 10 binding sites in its soluble pentameric form. Antibody classes and subclasses also differ in their ability to engage Fc receptors, which in turn influences the effector functions elicited by immune complexes.

Similarly, the glycosylation of IgG antibodies is a key modifier of effector functions, with afucosylation of the Fc glycan resulting in markedly enhanced affinity for CD16 and consequently enhanced inflammation, whereas sialylation of the Fc glycan causes IgG to change conformation and enables binding to type II FcγRs, which have anti-inflammatory effects. Galactosylation of the Fc glycan promotes oligomerization of IgG, facilitating efficient complement activation.

== Type IV hypersensitivity ==
Type IV hypersensitivity

Type IV hypersensitivity reactions are classically described as delayed-type hypersensitivities (DTH) because onset of symptoms following exposure takes 48–72 hours. Formally, however, the term DTH is most tightly associated with tuberculin skin testing and reflects type IVa hypersensitivity (see below). The 48- to 72-hour delay reflects the time required for: (1) antigen-specific memory T cells to encounter antigen and become activated, (2) these cells to proliferate locally, and (3) recruitment of effector cells to the site of exposure.

The critical feature of type IV hypersensitivity reactions is their dependency on T cells (type I, II, and III are dependent on antibodies). They may be initiated only after an antigen has been presented on class II MHC proteins and recognized by CD4 T cells. Initially, there is a sensitization event that elicits T cell responses against the antigen (not IgE in this case), which results in memory CD4 T cells. Re-exposure results in a more rapid response from these cells.

CD8 T cells may also play a role in type IV hypersensitivities (particularly type IVc), but they are dependent on CD4 T cells for activation, hence induction of CD4 T cell responses is the essential aspect of type IV hypersensitivities. Limited helper-independent CD8 T cell priming can occur under strong innate adjuvanticity, but helper T cell-dependent licensing is the prevailing mechanism in classic type IV disease.

The specific nature of the hypersensitivity reaction depends on the characteristics of the T cell response to the antigen:

- Type IVa (Th1/macrophage-predominant): Th1 cells produce IFN-γ and TNF-α to activate macrophages, leading to granuloma formation in persistent responses. Examples: tuberculin skin test; granulomatous inflammation to mycobacterial antigens; allergic contact dermatitis.
- Type IVb (Th2/eosinophil-predominant): Th2 cells produce IL-4/IL-5/IL-13 to induce eosinophilic inflammation. Examples: drug reaction with eosinophilia and systemic symptoms (DRESS); some chronic eczematous drug eruptions.
- Type IVc (cytotoxic T-cell-predominant): CD8 T cells (typically activated by Th1 cells in addition to professional antigen presenting cells) release perforin, granzyme B, and Fas-FasL interactions to cause direct cell death. Examples: Stevens–Johnson syndrome/toxic epidermal necrolysis, fixed drug eruption, acute T-cell–mediated graft rejection (graft rejection often has type IVa features as well).
- Type IVd (T-cell/neutrophil-predominant): T-cell–derived CXCL8 (IL-8) and GM-CSF recruit/activate neutrophils. Examples: acute generalized exanthematous pustulosis; pustular psoriasis.

Many DTH reactions are hapten-dependent, such as for various metal allergies (nickel, chromium). The hapten modifies or associates with a carrier to generate neo-epitopes (often covalent for classic haptens such as many drugs; metal ions can act via coordination with peptides/MHC rather than strictly covalent binding). Small molecule drugs can also function as haptens e.g., penicillin (penicillin may elicit all 4 types of hypersensitivity reactions defined by Gell and Coombs).

Diagnosis of Type IV hypersensitivities varies by subtype. Contact dermatitis (IVa) is diagnosed via patch testing, where suspected allergens are applied to the skin and read at 48–72 hours. Drug-related Type IV reactions are typically diagnosed clinically, as provocative testing is dangerous. The tuberculin skin test itself is a diagnostic use of Type IV hypersensitivity.

In contrast with type I hypersensitivities, type IV hypersensitivities are generally not amenable to desensitization, especially toxic epidermal necrolysis or Stevens-Johnson syndrome wherein re-exposure can be fatal. Prevention emphasizes avoidance of the offending allergen.

Treatment involves removing the antigen when possible and immunosuppression appropriate to severity: topical corticosteroids for contact dermatitis, systemic corticosteroids for DRESS, and supportive care for SJS/TEN. Unlike Type I reactions, antihistamines may provide limited symptomatic relief (e.g., pruritus) but are not disease-modifying; epinephrine has no role.

Conditions that impair T cell responses can reduce type IV hypersensitivity reactions, although there are important nuances (see Effects of Immunodeficiencies on Hypersensitivity Reactions).

== Effects of Immunodeficiencies on Hypersensitivity Reactions ==
Intuitively, it might be expected that because hypersensitivities represent inappropriate responses of the immune system, immunodeficient states should lend themselves to protection against such reactions or less severe reactions. However, several clinically important paradoxes demonstrate that this is not necessarily the case.

- Psoriasis: Psoriasis pathogenesis shares features with type IV hypersensitivity (in particular, type IVd for pustular psoriasis) with a clear Th17 cell-driven phenotype, but may drastically worsen in HIV infection because regulatory T cells are depleted by HIV and because the loss of T cells can contribute to skin dysbiosis that promotes inflammation. Psoriasis may even be the initial presentation for acute retroviral syndrome.
- Complement deficiency: Despite the centrality of complement in type III hypersensitivities such as lupus, complement deficiencies (particularly in the classical pathway) are a major risk factor for developing systemic lupus erythematosus. This is believed to be due to the fact that in the absence of complement components, immune complexes persist for longer and can promote destructive inflammation in tissues, helping to enable autoantibody responses.
- IgA deficiency and Celiac disease: Celiac disease (a predominantly type IV hypersensitivity) is another example of such a paradox: despite IgA against tissue transglutaminase and gliadin being part of the diagnostic testing for celiac disease, IgA deficiency markedly increases the risk of celiac disease development, and so total IgA titers should be obtained in conjunction with other serologies to ensure negative results are true negatives.
- Omenn syndrome: Omenn syndrome is a form of severe combined immunodeficiency in which there is a near complete absence of B cells, limited oligoclonal autoreactive T cells that produce type 2 cytokines, and a tendency towards IgE production with eosinophilia, causing a predisposition towards type I and type IVb (under EAACI 2023 taxonomies) hypersensitivities.

These paradoxes illustrate that hypersensitivity reactions reflect immune dysregulation rather than mere hyperreactivity. Loss of regulatory mechanisms, impaired clearance of antigens or immune complexes, and compensatory immune responses can all lead to hypersensitivity manifestations in immunodeficient states.
