= Nicolas Maurice Arthus =

French immunologist and physiologist

Nicolas Maurice Arthus (/ɑːrˈtjuːs/, 9 January 1862 – 24 February 1945) was a French immunologist and physiologist. The Arthus reaction, a localized inflammatory response, is named after him.

== Biography ==
Arthus was born on 9 January 1862 in Angers, France. He studied medicine in Paris and received his doctorate in 1886. In 1896 he became Professor of Physiology at the University of Fribourg, Switzerland. He returned to France to work at the Pasteur Institute in 1900, and later taught at the Ecole de Médecine de Marseille (currently integrated in the University of the Mediterranean). In 1907, he was appointed to the Chair of Physiology at the University of Lausanne in Switzerland, where he remained for twenty-five years. He died in Fribourg on 24 February 1945.

Apart from the reaction named after him, Arthus is best known for his work on anaphylaxis. He also studied snake venom and the role of calcium in the coagulation of blood.

== Selected bibliography ==
Bibliography:

- Nouvelle théorie chimique de la coagulation du sang. With Calixte Pages. Archives de physiologie normale et pathologique, Paris, 1890, 5th ser., 2: 739-746. First demonstration of the essential role of calcium in the mechanism of blood coagulation.
- Coagulation des liquides de l'organisme (sang, lymphe, transsudats). Paris 1894.
- Précis de chimie physiologique. Paris 1895; 10th edition, 1924,
- Nature des enzymes. Paris 1896.
- Précis de physiologie. Paris 1901; 7th edition, 1927.
- Injections répétées de serum du cheval zhez le lapin. Comptes rendus des séances de la Société de biologie, Paris, 1903; 55: 817-820.
- La physiologie. Paris 1920.
- De l'anaphylaxie à l'immunité; anaphylaxie, protéotoxies, evenimations, anaphylaxie-immunité, sérums antivenimeux. Paris, Masson, 1921. 363 pages. Paris 1921.
- Philosophy of scientific investigation; preface to De l'anaphylaxie à l'immunité, Paris, 1921. Translated from the French with an introduction by Henry E. Sigerist. Baltimore, Johns Hopkins Press, 1943, 26 pages. Also in: Bulletin of the History of Medicine, Baltimore, 1943; 3. v.14.
- P. Nolf, N. M. Arthus, et al.: Hommage à Léon Fredericq, professeur de physiologie à l’Université de Liége. Liége, 1938. 79 pages.
- (with Calixte Pagès) Nouvelle théorie chimique de la coagulation du sang, Archives de physiologie normale et pathologique, Paris, 5th ser., 2 (1890), 739–746.
- Éléments de chimie physiologique, Paris: G. Masson, 1895.
- Eléments de physiologie, Paris: Masson, 1902.
- Injections répétées de serum du cheval chez le lapin, Comptes rendus des séances de la Société de biologie et ses filiales, Paris, 55 (1903), 817–820.
- Précis de physiologie microbienne, Paris: Masson, 1921.
