= Zirconium granuloma =

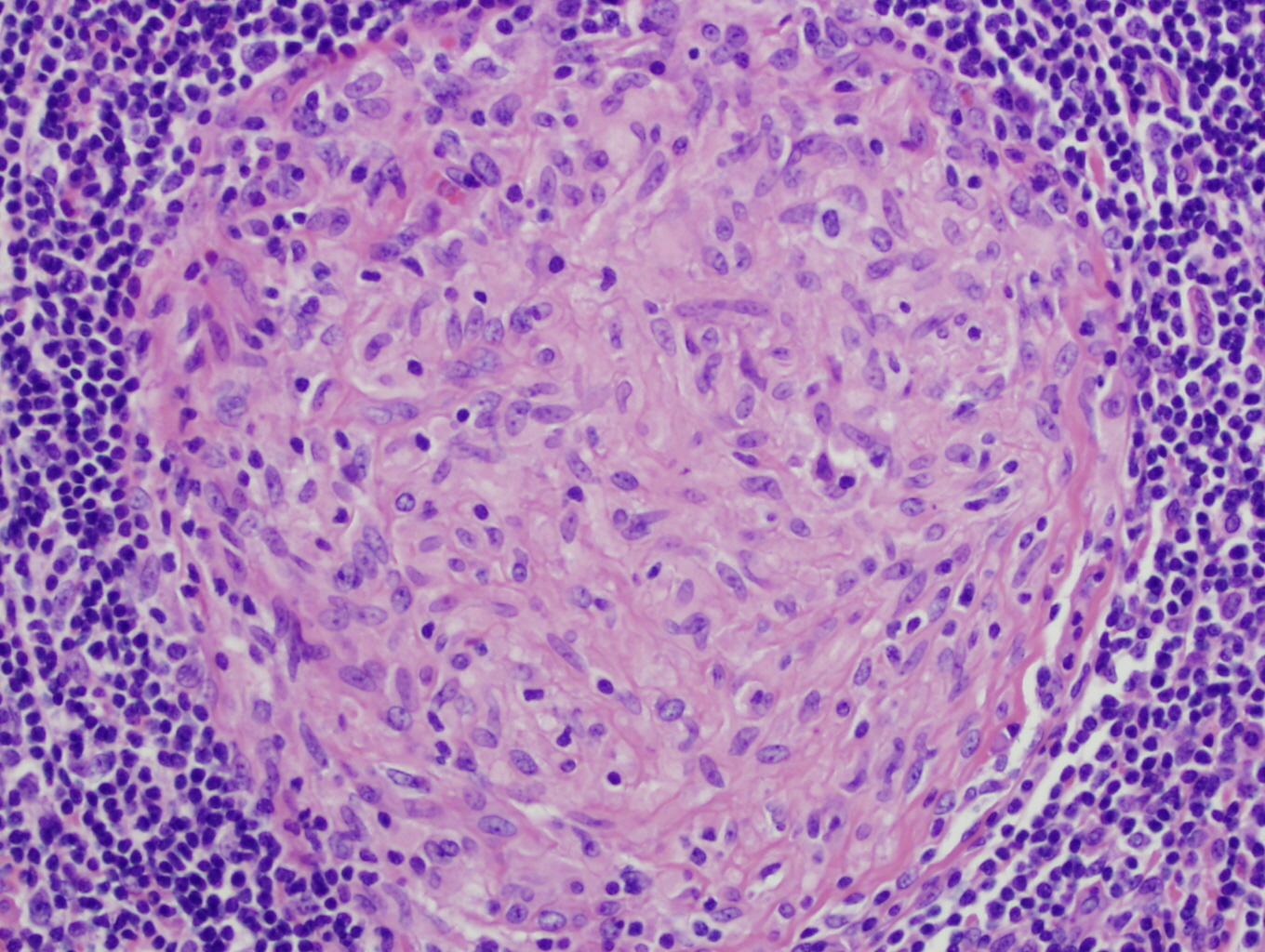
- Histological image
- Specialty: Dermatology

Zirconium granulomas are a skin condition characterized by a papular eruption involving the axillae, and are sometimes considered an allergic reaction to deodorant containing zirconium lactate. They are the result of a delayed granulomatous hypersensitivity reaction, and can also occur from exposure to aluminum zirconium complexes. Commonly, zirconium containing products are used to relieve toxicodendron irritation. The lesions are similar to those from sarcoidosis, and commonly manifest four to six weeks after contact. They appear as erythematous, firm, raised, shiny papules. Corticosteroids are used to ease the inflammation, but curative treatment is currently unavailable.

== See also ==
- Granuloma
- Skin lesion
