= Serum sickness-like reaction =

Serum sickness–like reactions (SSLRs) are adverse reactions that have symptoms similar to those of serum sickness (type III immune complex hypersensitivity) but in which immune complexes are not found.

== Causes ==
Agents that have been implicated in serum sickness–like reactions include cefaclor, amoxicillin, sulfonamides, tetracyclines, ciprofloxacin, nonsteroidal anti-inflammatory drugs, barbiturates, carbamazepine, propranolol, thiouracil, and allopurinol. Metabolites of these drugs might bind with tissue proteins inappropriately, eliciting an acute inflammatory response that typically develops 7–14 days after initiation of the offending agent. Acute hepatitis B will sometimes be complicated with this syndrome, which often resolves with the onset of jaundice.

== Pathogenesis ==
Serum sickness–like reaction is named for its clinical similarity to serum sickness, in which immune complexes are deposited in the skin, joints, and other organs. True serum sickness, a type III hypersensitivity reaction, results in fever, lymphadenopathy, arthralgias, cutaneous eruptions, gastrointestinal disturbances, proteinuria, and significant decreases in serum complement levels; it was originally described after patients were infused with equine immunoglobulins.

In contrast, serum sickness–like reactions are specific drug reactions that are not associated with circulating immune complexes.

Although the exact pathogenesis is poorly understood, serum sickness–like reactions are thought to originate from an abnormal inflammatory reaction that occurs in response to defective metabolism of drug byproducts generated during pharmacologic therapy; the metabolic flaw could be a maternally-inherited trait. In vivo hepatic drug biotransformation studies have shown greater lymphocyte killing in subjects with a known history of serum sickness–like reactions than in control subjects.

== Diagnosis ==
The reaction generally includes a constellation of fever; urticarial polycyclic wheals (a rash that can look similar to hives with small swellings that overlap each other) with central clearing on the trunk, extremities, face, and lateral borders of the hands and feet; oral edema without mucosal involvement; lymphadenopathy; arthralgias; myalgias; and mild proteinuria. Case reports have noted the absence of fever in serum sickness–like reactions to amoxicillin. Laboratory abnormalities include normal or mild decreases in serum C3, C4, and CH50 levels, and mild proteinuria. In contrast to true serum sickness, renal and hepatic involvement is rare. Significant decreases in serum C3, C4, and CH50, reported in the literature for true serum sickness, are rarely described in serum sickness–like reaction.

== Management ==
Serum sickness–like reaction is an acute self-limited reaction with an ultimately favorable outcome. Treatment is typically symptomatic, but hospitalization may be required for severe cases. While optimal treatment strategies for serum sickness–like reactions are not clearly defined in the literature, discontinuation of the suspected agent combined with use of antihistamines, corticosteroids and NSAIDs for symptom control is an appropriate therapeutic route. Case reports have shown that treatment with prednisone, 60 mg daily, and high doses of H1 and H2 antihistamines help resolve the arthralgias and myalgias within 24 hours and the remaining symptoms within 48–72 hours

== See also ==
- List of cutaneous conditions

== General and cited references ==
- Mener DJ, Negrini C, Blatt A: "Itching like mad". American Journal of Medicine. 2009; 8(122): 732–734.
