= Type II hypersensitivity =

Type of allergic reaction

- Specialty: Immunology

Type II hypersensitivity, in the Gell and Coombs classification of allergic reactions, is an antibody-mediated process in which IgG and IgM antibodies are directed against antigens on cells (such as circulating red blood cells) or extracellular material (such as basement membrane). This subsequently leads to cell lysis, tissue damage or loss of function through mechanisms such as

1. complement activation via the classical complement pathway
2. Antibody-dependent cellular cytotoxicity or
3. anti-receptor activity.

The activation of the complement system results in opsonization, the agglutination of red blood cells, cell lysis, and cell death.

Type II hypersensitivity reactions are also known as antibody-mediated cytotoxic reactions. These reactions usually take between 2 and 24 hours to develop.

== Examples ==
Disease	Autoantibody target
Autoimmune hemolytic anemia	Red blood cells
Goodpasture syndrome	Glomerular basement membrane
Graves' disease	Thyroid stimulating hormone receptor
Immune thrombocytopenia	Platelets
Myasthenia gravis	Muscle acetylcholine receptor

An example of complement dependent type II hypersensitivity is an acute hemolytic transfusion reaction following transfusion of ABO incompatible blood. Preformed antibody (predominantly IgM) against donor red cell antigens not found in an individual of a particular blood group (e.g. anti-A IgM in an individual with blood group B), bind to the donor red cell surface and lead to rapid complement mediated haemolysis and potentially life-threatening clinical consequences. Complement-dependent type II hypersensitivity can also occur during the transmission of incompatible maternal antibodies to fetal red blood cells causing hemolytic anemia in the fetus, known as erythroblastosis fetalis.

Another example of a complement dependent type II hypersensitivity reaction is Goodpasture's syndrome, where the basement membrane (containing collagen type IV) in the lung and kidney is attacked by one's own antibodies in a complement mediated fashion.

An example of anti-receptor type II hypersensitivity (also classified as type V hypersensitivity) is observed in Graves' disease, in which anti-thyroid stimulating hormone receptor antibodies lead to increased production of thyroxine.

However, there are questions as to the relevance of the Gell and Coombs classification of allergic reactions in modern-day understanding of allergy and it has limited utility in clinical practice.

== See also ==
- Type I hypersensitivity
- Type III hypersensitivity
- Type IV hypersensitivity
