= Type IV hypersensitivity =

Type of allergic reaction

- Other names: Delayed-type hypersensitivity; cell-mediated hypersensitivity
- Specialty: Immunology

Type IV hypersensitivity, in the Gell and Coombs classification of allergic reactions, often called delayed-type hypersensitivity (DTH), is a type of hypersensitivity reaction that can take a day or more to develop. Unlike the other types, it is not humoral (not antibody-mediated) but rather is a type of cell-mediated response. This response involves the interaction of T cells, monocytes, and macrophages.

This reaction is caused when CD4^{+} T_{h}1 cells recognize foreign antigen in a complex with the MHC class II on the surface of antigen-presenting cells. These can be macrophages that secrete IL-12, which stimulates the proliferation of further CD4^{+} T_{h}1 cells. CD4^{+} T cells secrete IL-2 and interferon gamma (IFNγ), inducing the further release of other T_{h}1 cytokines, thus mediating the immune response. Activated CD8^{+} T cells destroy target cells on contact, whereas activated macrophages produce hydrolytic enzymes and, on presentation with certain intracellular pathogens, transform into multinucleated giant cells.

The overreaction of the helper T cells and overproduction of cytokines damage tissues, cause inflammation, and cell death. Type IV hypersensitivity can usually be resolved with topical corticosteroids and trigger avoidance.

== Forms ==
Disease	Target antigen	Effects
Allergic contact dermatitis	Environmental chemicals, like urushiol (from poison ivy and poison oak), metals (e.g. nickel), topical medication	epidermal necrosis, inflammation, skin rash, and blisters
Autoimmune myocarditis	Myosin heavy chain protein	Cardiomyopathy
Diabetes mellitus type 1	Pancreatic beta cell proteins (possibly insulin, glutamate decarboxylase)	Insulitis, beta cell destruction
Granulomas	Various, depending on underlying disease	Walled-off lesion containing macrophages and other cells
Some peripheral neuropathies	Schwann cell antigen	Neuritis, paralysis
Hashimoto's thyroiditis	Thyroglobulin antigen	Hypothyroidism, hard goiter, follicular thymitis
Inflammatory bowel disease	Enteric microbiota and/or self antigens	Hyperactivation of T-cells, cytokine release, recruitment of macrophages and other immune cells, inflammation
Multiple sclerosis	Myelin antigens (e.g., myelin basic protein)	Myelin destruction, inflammation
Rheumatoid arthritis	Possibly collagen and/or citrullinated self proteins	Chronic arthritis, inflammation, destruction of articular cartilage and bone
Tuberculin reaction (Mantoux test)	Tuberculin	Induration and erythema around injection site indicates previous exposure

An example of a tuberculosis (TB) infection that comes under control: M. tuberculosis cells are engulfed by macrophages after being identified as foreign but, due to an immuno-escape mechanism peculiar to mycobacteria, TB bacteria block the fusion of their enclosing phagosome with lysosomes which would destroy the bacteria. Thereby TB can continue to replicate within macrophages. After several weeks, the immune system somehow [mechanism as yet unexplained] ramps up and, upon stimulation with interferon gamma, the macrophages become capable of killing M. tuberculosis by forming phagolysosomes and nitric oxide radicals. The hyper-activated macrophages secrete TNF-α which recruits multiple monocytes to the site of infection. These cells differentiate into epithelioid cells which wall off the infected cells, but results in significant inflammation and local damage.

Some other clinical examples:

- Urushiol-induced contact dermatitis
- Chronic transplant rejection
- Coeliac disease
- Giant cell arteritis
- Graft-versus-host disease
- Leprosy

== See also ==
- Hypersensitivity
- Type I hypersensitivity
- Type II hypersensitivity
- Type III hypersensitivity
