= Type III hypersensitivity =

Type of allergic reaction

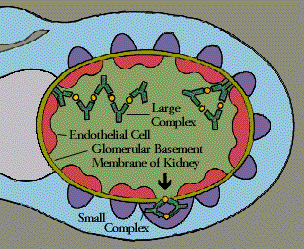
- Immune complex
- Specialty: Immunology

Type III hypersensitivity, in the Gell and Coombs classification of allergic reactions, occurs when there is accumulation of immune complexes (antigen-antibody complexes) that have not been adequately cleared by innate immune cells, giving rise to an inflammatory response and attraction of leukocytes. There are three steps that lead to this response. The first step is immune complex formation, which involves the binding of antigens to antibodies to form mobile immune complexes. The second step is immune complex deposition, during which the complexes leave the plasma and are deposited into tissues. Finally, the third step is the inflammatory reaction, during which the classical pathway is activated and macrophages and neutrophils are recruited to the affected tissues. Such reactions may progress to immune complex diseases.

== Types ==
Some clinical examples:

Disease	Target antigen	Main effects
Systemic lupus erythematosus	Nuclear antigens	Nephritis; Skin lesions; Arthritis
Rheumatoid Arthritis	IgG (Fc region)	Arthritis
IgA nephropathy	IgA antibodies with O-glycans deficient in galactose	Nephritis
Post-streptococcal glomerulonephritis	Streptococcal cell wall antigens	Nephritis
Polyarteritis nodosa	Hepatitis B virus surface antigen	Systemic vasculitis
Reactive arthritis	Several bacterial antigens	Acute arthritis
Serum sickness	Various	Arthritis; Vasculitis; Nephritis
Arthus reaction	Various	Cutaneous vasculitis
Farmer's Lung	Inhaled antigens (often mould or hay dust)	Alveolar inflammation
Henoch–Schönlein purpura (IgA vasculitis)	Unknown, likely respiratory pathogen	Purpura; Glomerulonephritis
Unless else specified in boxes, then ref is:

Other examples are:

- Subacute bacterial endocarditis
- Symptoms of malaria

== Pathogenesis ==
Gel and Coombs defined type III hypersensitivity reactions as those involving soluble immune complexes (in contrast to type II hypersensitivities which involve membrane-bound antigens that can be targeted by cytotoxic antibodies). In the presence of a multivalent antigen (one which can bind multiple antibodies simultaneously), the antibodies may crosslink to form lattices of antibody and antigen known as immune complexes. The size of an immune complex is an important determinant of its properties: larger immune complexes tend to be phagocytosed more easily than smaller ones, which have a tendency to get trapped in the vasculature wherein they may provoke inflammation. Larger immune complexes also bind more avidly to Fc receptors, however. Immune complex size depends on both the quantity of antigen and antibody, with smaller complexes occurring at both a great excess of antigen and a relatively small amount. Another determinant of immune complex properties is its charge, and in particular the charge of the antigen. Positively charged antigens have an affinity for negatively charged surfaces such as the basement membrane of glomeruli in the kidney or skin; however this may also be because the antigens are trafficking to those sites before the immune complex is formed. IgG or IgM within the immune complexes may furthermore recruit the classical pathway of the complement cascade and bind C1q which can result in immune complexes containing C3. C3 can then be bound by CD35 on the surface of erythrocytes which delivers these immune complexes to phagocytes such as Kupffer cells and red pulp macrophages. This is particularly expedient for large immune complexes. Nonetheless, while complement may promote attachment of immune complexes to phagocytes, the process is mediated by the Fc receptors, and so the role of complement in this process is best viewed as an expediter of phagocytosis. This is particularly noteworthy because systemic lupus erythematosus, a canonical type III hypersensitivity-driven autoimmune disease, has been associated with deficiency of certain components of the complement cascade, which promote persistence of the immune complexes.

The mechanism by which immune complexes are pathogenic is complex and much of what we know is derived from experimental models of the Arthus reaction and serum sickness. These models support that Fc receptors play a dominant role in the response which can be augmented by the complement system via the anaphylatoxin C5a. Ligation of Fc receptors on the surfaces of immune effector cells can give rise to a number of responses, such as degranulation (e.g., of mast cells, causing histamine liberation and subsequent urticaria), phagocytosis, release of pro-inflammatory cytokines and chemokines, platelet activation resulting in the formation of clots, etc.

== Signs and symptoms ==
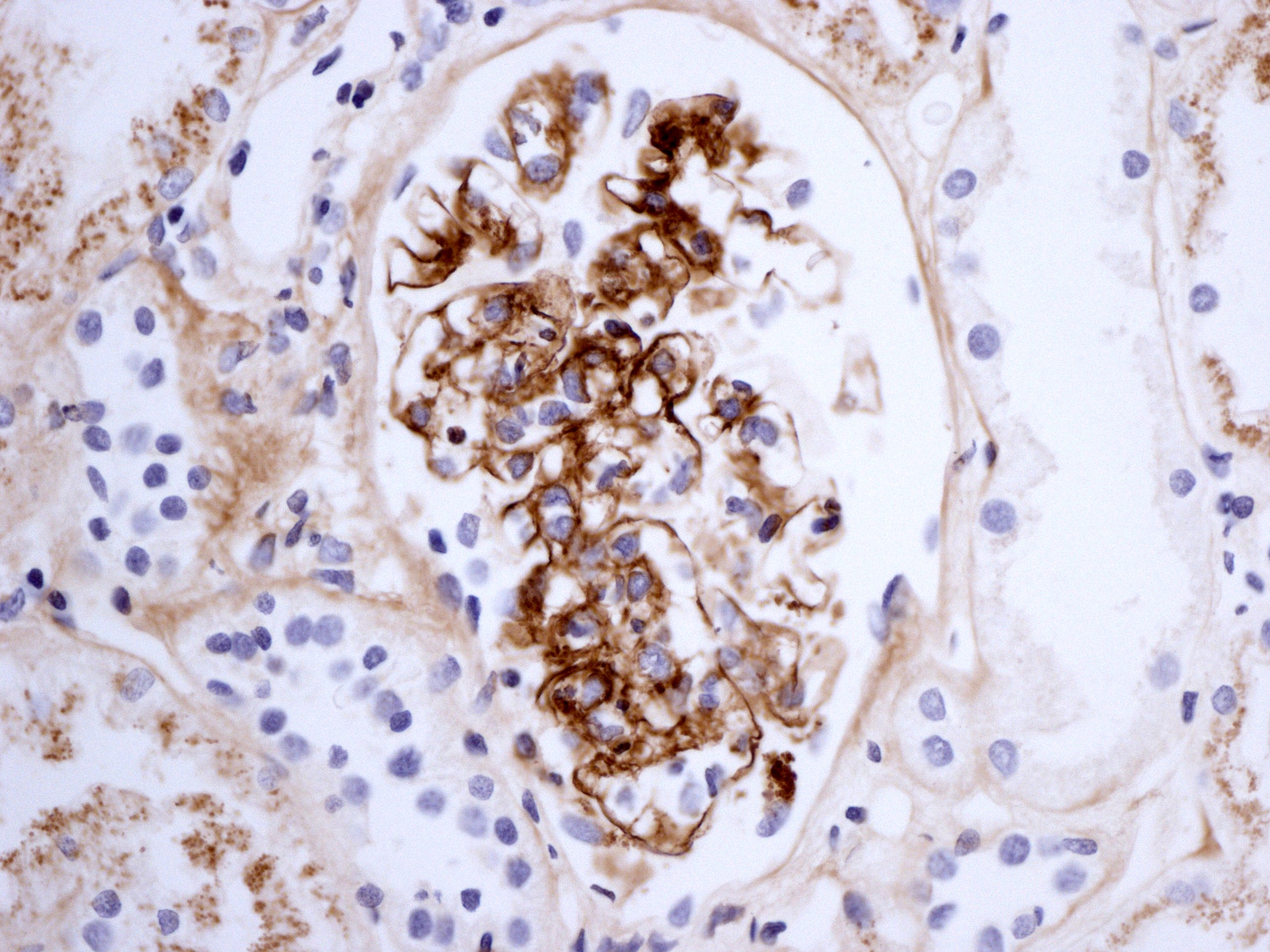
Immune complex glomerulonephritis, as seen in Henoch–Schönlein purpura; this is an example of IgA involvement in a nephropathy

The reaction can take hours, days, or even weeks to develop, depending on whether or not there is immunological memory of the precipitating antigen. Typically, clinical features emerge a week following initial antigen challenge, when the deposited immune complexes can precipitate an inflammatory response. Because of the nature of the antibody aggregation, tissues that are associated with blood filtration at considerable osmotic and hydrostatic gradient (e.g. sites of urinary and synovial fluid formation, kidney glomeruli and joint tissues respectively) bear the brunt of the damage. Hence, vasculitis, glomerulonephritis and arthritis are commonly associated conditions as a result of type III hypersensitivity responses.

As observed under methods of histopathology, acute necrotizing vasculitis within the affected tissues is observed concomitant to neutrophilic infiltration, along with notable eosinophilic deposition (fibrinoid necrosis). Often, immunofluorescence microscopy can be used to visualize the immune complexes. Skin response to hypersensitivity of this type is referred to as an Arthus reaction and is characterized by local erythema and some induration. Platelet aggregation, especially in microvasculature, can cause localized clot formation, leading to blotchy hemorrhages. This typifies the response to injection of foreign antigen sufficient to lead to the condition of serum sickness.

The relevance of the Gell and Coombs classification of allergic reactions is questioned in the modern-day understanding of allergy, and it has limited utility in clinical practice.

== See also ==
- Type I hypersensitivity
- Type II hypersensitivity
- Type IV hypersensitivity
