= Type I hypersensitivity =

Type of allergic reaction

- Other names: Immediate hypersensitivity
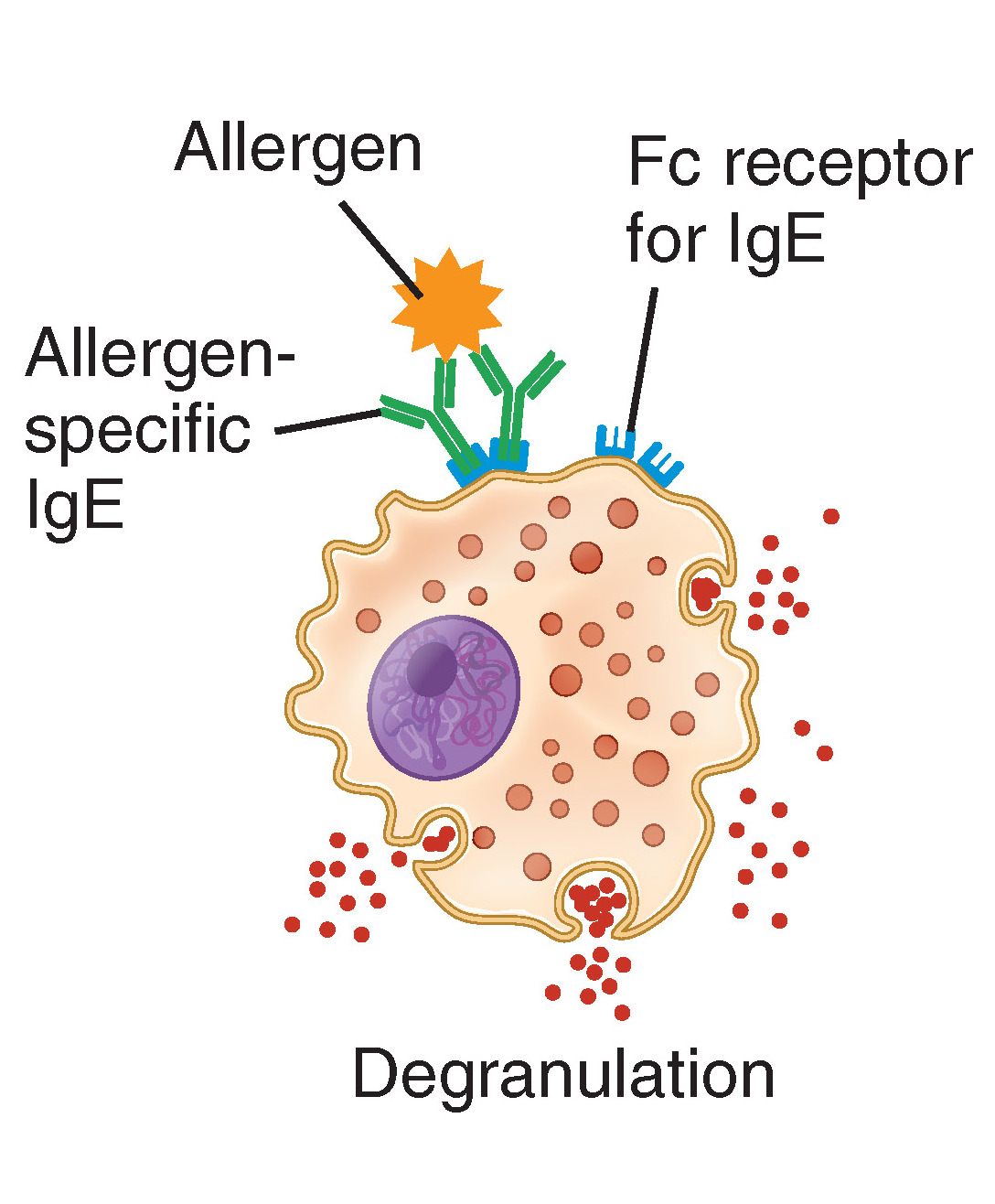
- Image showing the mechanism of activation of type 1 hypersensitivity in a mast cell.
- Specialty: Immunology

Type I hypersensitivity (or immediate hypersensitivity), in the Gell and Coombs classification of allergic reactions, is an allergic reaction provoked by re-exposure to a specific type of antigen referred to as an allergen. Type I is distinct from type II, type III and type IV hypersensitivities. The relevance of the Gell and Coombs classification of allergic reactions has been questioned in the modern-day understanding of allergy, and it has limited utility in clinical practice.

Exposure may be by ingestion, inhalation, injection, or direct contact.

== Pathophysiology ==
In type I hypersensitivity, B cells are stimulated (by CD4^{+} T_{h}2 cells) to produce IgE antibodies specific to an antigen. The difference between a normal infectious immune response and a type 1 hypersensitivity response is that in type 1 hypersensitivity, the antibody is IgE instead of IgA, IgG, or IgM. During sensitization, the IgE antibodies bind to FcεRI receptors on the surface of tissue mast cells and blood basophils. Mast cells and basophils coated by IgE antibodies are "sensitized". Later exposure to the same allergen cross-links the bound IgE on sensitized cells, resulting in anaphylactic degranulation, which is the immediate and explosive release of pharmacologically active pre-formed mediators from storage granules and concurrent synthesis of inflammatory lipid mediators from arachidonic acid; some of these mediators include histamine, leukotriene (LTC4 and LTD4 and LTB4), and prostaglandin, which act on proteins (e.g., G-protein coupled receptors) located on surrounding tissues. The principal effects of these products are vasodilation and smooth-muscle contraction.

A summary of the pathophysiology of a type 1 hypersensitivity reaction.

Type I hypersensitivity can be further classified into immediate and late-phase reactions. Within minutes of exposure to an antigen, the immediate hypersensitivity occurs, releasing histamines and lipid mediators which are responsible for the initial allergic reaction response. However, about 4-12 hours after antigen exposure, a cough and wheezing may persist in the patient, along with swelling and redness of the skin. This is known as the late-phase hypersensitivity reaction which can last from approximately 1-3 days and is caused by the release of additional mediators from the mast cells and basophils.

List of a few mediators released by mast cells in type 1 hypersensitivity and their actions
Vasodilation and increased permeability	Histamine; PAF; Leukotriene C4, D4, and E4; Prostaglandin D2; Neutral proteases
Smooth muscle spasm	Histamine; PAF; Leukotriene C4, D4, and E4; Prostaglandin
Leukocyte extravasation	Cytokines (e.g. chemokines and TNF); Leukotriene B4; Chemotactic factors for neutrophils and eosinophils
Unless otherwise specified, the reference for this table is:

The reaction may be either local or systemic. Symptoms vary from mild irritation to sudden death from anaphylactic shock.

== Treatment and prognosis ==
If multiple systems are involved, then anaphylaxis can take place, which is an acute, systemic reaction that can prove fatal.

Treatment usually involves adrenaline (epinephrine) because it counteracts anaphylaxis by increasing blood flow and relaxing bronchial muscles that block one’s airways. Antihistamines and corticosteroids are also commonly used in less severe reactions.

== Examples ==
- Allergic asthma
- Allergic conjunctivitis
- Allergic rhinitis ("hay fever")
- Anaphylaxis
- Angioedema
- Urticaria (hives)
- Eosinophilia
- Penicillin allergy
- Cephalosporin allergy
- Food allergy
- Sweet itch

== See also ==
- Hypersensitivity
