= Vasculitic neuropathy =

- Specialty: Neurology

Vasculitic neuropathy is a peripheral neuropathic disease. In a vasculitic neuropathy there is damage to the vessels that supply blood to the nerves. It can be as part of a systemic problem or can exist as a single-organ issue only affecting the peripheral nervous system (PNS). It is diagnosed with the use of electrophysiological testing, blood tests, nerve biopsy and clinical examination. It is a serious medical condition that can cause prolonged morbidity and disability and generally requires treatment. Treatment depends on the type but it is mostly with corticosteroids or immunomodulating therapies.

== Types ==
There are three main categories of vasculitic neuropathies: primary, secondary and non-systemic.

=== Primary systemic vasculitic neuropathy ===
Some patients with systemic vasculitis will have their multi-organ disease spread to the peripheral nervous system; this is primary vasculitic neuropathy. Some examples of systemic vasculitic disease are: IgA vasculitis, Hypocomplementemic urticarial vasculitis, polyarteritis nodosa (PAN) and anti-neutrophil cytoplasmic antibody (ANCA) associated vasculitides such as granulomatosis with polyangiitis (GPA), eosinophilic granulomatosis with polyangiitis (EGPA) and microscopic polyangiitis (MPA).

=== Vasculitic neuropathy secondary to other disease ===
Some patients with a non-vasculitic systemic disease or another illness such as infection or malignancy can subsequently develop vasculitic neuropathy as a direct consequence of the former illness; this is secondary vasculitic neuropathy. Some examples of such illness which can cause vasculitic neuropathy are:

- Connective tissue diseases: rheumatoid arthritis, systemic lupus erythematosus, primary sjögren's, dermatomyositis.
- Infectious diseases: hepatitis B, hepatitis C, human immunodeficiency virus (HIV), cytomegalovirus, lyme disease, human T-cell-lymphotrophic virus-I, parvovirus B19.
- Malignancy.
- Drugs (amphetamines, sympathomimetics, cocaine, etc.)
- Vaccinations.

=== Non-systemic vasculitic neuropathy ===
Non-systemic vasculitic neuropathy (NSVN) is a diagnosis of elimination. When no systemic illness can be found, yet evidence of a vasculitic neuropathy exists, a diagnosis of non-systemic vasculitic neuropathy is made. It is a single-organ problem. A nerve biopsy is required in order to make the diagnosis of non-systemic vasculitic neuropathy.

There are distinct subtypes of NSVN with evolving categorisation in the literature. Currently accepted subtypes are:

- 'Classical' distal-predominant NSVN
- Wartenberg migratory sensory neuropathy
- Post-surgical inflammatory neuropathy
- Diabetic radiculoplexus neuropathy (lumbosacral, thoracic or cervical predominant)
- Neuralgic amyotrophy
- Non-systemic skin/nerve vasculitis (for example, cutaneous PAN)

==== 'Classical' distal-predominant NSVN ====
There is an ongoing debate over this categorisation, particularly its overlap with the condition non-diabetic radiculoplexus neuropathy. This neuropathy involves a clinical picture where the nerve damage is distally predominant as demonstrated in a nerve biopsy.

==== Warternberg migratory sensory neuropathy ====
Warternberg migratory sensory neuropathy is typically a multi-focal neuropathy where there is pure sensory deficits. It is characterised by sudden-onset and chronicity as well as having a propensity for relapse. It generally resolves slowly with time.

==== Postsurgical inflammatory neuropathy ====
Postsurgical inflammatory neuropathy is typically a multi-focal neuropathy which manifests thirty days after a surgical procedure. It mostly presents with motor and sensory symptoms. It is generally a self-limiting condition that has resolved with and without treatment.

== Diagnosis ==
Diagnosis of a vasculitic neuropathy depends on whether the patient first presents with multiple symptoms pointing at a systemic disorder or else primary neuropathic complaints. In the former case the patient is more likely to be assessed first by a rheumatologist and in the latter a neurologist or neurosurgeon.

== Treatments ==
Treatment of vasculitic neuropathy depends on the type.
