= Immune complex =

Molecule formed binding antigens to antibodies

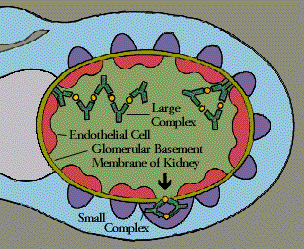
Immune complex diseases

An immune complex, sometimes called an antigen-antibody complex or antigen-bound antibody, is a molecule formed from the binding of multiple antigens to antibodies. The bound antigen and antibody act as a unitary object, effectively an antigen of its own with a specific epitope. After an antigen-antibody reaction, the immune complexes can be subject to any of a number of responses, including complement deposition, opsonization, phagocytosis, or processing by proteases. Red blood cells carrying CR1-receptors on their surface may bind C3b-coated immune complexes and transport them to phagocytes, mostly in liver and spleen, and return to the general circulation.

The ratio of antigen to antibody determines size and shape of immune complex. This, in turn, determines the effect of the immune complex. Many innate immune cells have FcRs, which are membrane-bound receptors that bind the constant regions of antibodies. Most FcRs on innate immune cells have low affinity for a singular antibody, and instead need to bind to an immune complex containing multiple antibodies in order to begin their intracellular signaling pathway and pass along a message from outside to inside of the cell. Additionally, the grouping and binding together of multiple immune complexes allows for an increase in the avidity, or strength of binding, of the FcRs. This allows innate immune cells to get multiple inputs at once and prevents them from being activated early.

Immune complexes may themselves cause illness when they are deposited in organs, for example, in certain forms of vasculitis. This is the third form of hypersensitivity in the Gell-Coombs classification, called type III hypersensitivity. Such hypersensitivity progressing to disease states produces the immune complex diseases.

Immune complex deposition is a prominent feature of several autoimmune diseases, including rheumatoid arthritis, cryoglobulinemia, scleroderma, polyarteritis nodosa, and Sjögren's syndrome. An inability to degrade immune complexes in the lysosome and subsequent accumulation on the surface of immune cells has been associated with systemic lupus erythematosus.

== Functions ==
=== Regulation of antibody production ===
Immune complexes can also play a role in the regulation of antibody production. B cells express B-cell receptors (BCRs) on their surfaces and antigen binding to these receptors begins a signaling cascade that leads to activation. B cells also express FcγRIIb, low affinity receptors specific to the constant region of IgG, on their surfaces. IgG immune complexes are the ligand for these receptors and immune complex binding to these receptors induces apoptosis, or cell death. After B cells are activated, they differentiate into plasma cells and cease to express BCR but continue to express FcγRIIb, which allows IgG immune complexes to regulate IgG production via negative feedback and prevent uncontrolled IgG production.

=== Activation of dendritic cells and macrophages ===
Immune complexes, particularly those made of IgG, also play a variety of roles in the activation and regulation of phagocytes, which include dendritic cells (DCs) and macrophages. Immune complexes are better at inducing DC maturation than an antigen on its own. Again, the low affinity of many FcγR for IgG means that only immune complexes, not single antibodies, can induce the FcγR's signaling cascade. When compared to single antibodies binding to FcγRs, immune complexes binding to FcγRs cause significant changes in internalization and processing of antigen, maturation of the vesicles containing the internalized antigen, and activation in DCs and macrophages. There are multiple classes of macrophages and DCs that express different FcγRs, which have differing affinities for single antibodies and immune complexes. This allows the response of the DC or macrophage to be tuned precisely, subsequently tuning the level of IgG. These diverse FcγRs cause different responses in their DCs or macrophages by initiating different signaling pathways that can either activate or inhibit cellular functions. The binding of the immune complex to the DC's membrane-bound receptor and internalization of the immune complex and receptor begins the process of antigen presentation, which allows the DC to activate T cells. Via this process, immune complexes cause enhanced T cell activation.

=== Elimination of opsonized immune complexes ===
Type I FcγRs activation begins a cascade of reactions to eliminate the IgG-opsonized target. Type I FcγRs is another type of IgG constant region receptor, which can bind to IgG immune complexes and lead to the elimination of the opsonized complex. Immune complexes bind to multiple type I FcγRs, which cluster on the cell surface and begin the ITAM signaling pathway. Although both activating and inhibitory Type I FcγRs can mediate phagocytosis, but the internalization of IgG-opsonized targets through activating FcγRs is more effective for response. Immune complexes bind to multiple type I FcγRs, which cluster on the cell surface and begin the Immunoreceptor Tyrosine-Based Activation Motif (ITAM) signaling pathway. ITAM is composed of tyrosine which is separated from a leucine or isoleucine by two other amino acids and is located in the cytoplasmic tail of the molecule. Following the clustering by IgG complexes, ITAM is phosphorylated by FcγRs crosslinking. This phosphorylation of the ITAM leads to pro-inflammatory signaling that mediates cellular activation which will induce a signaling cascade and eventually leads to elimination of opsonized immune complex.
