= Systemic vasculitis =

- Other names: Necrotizing vasculitis
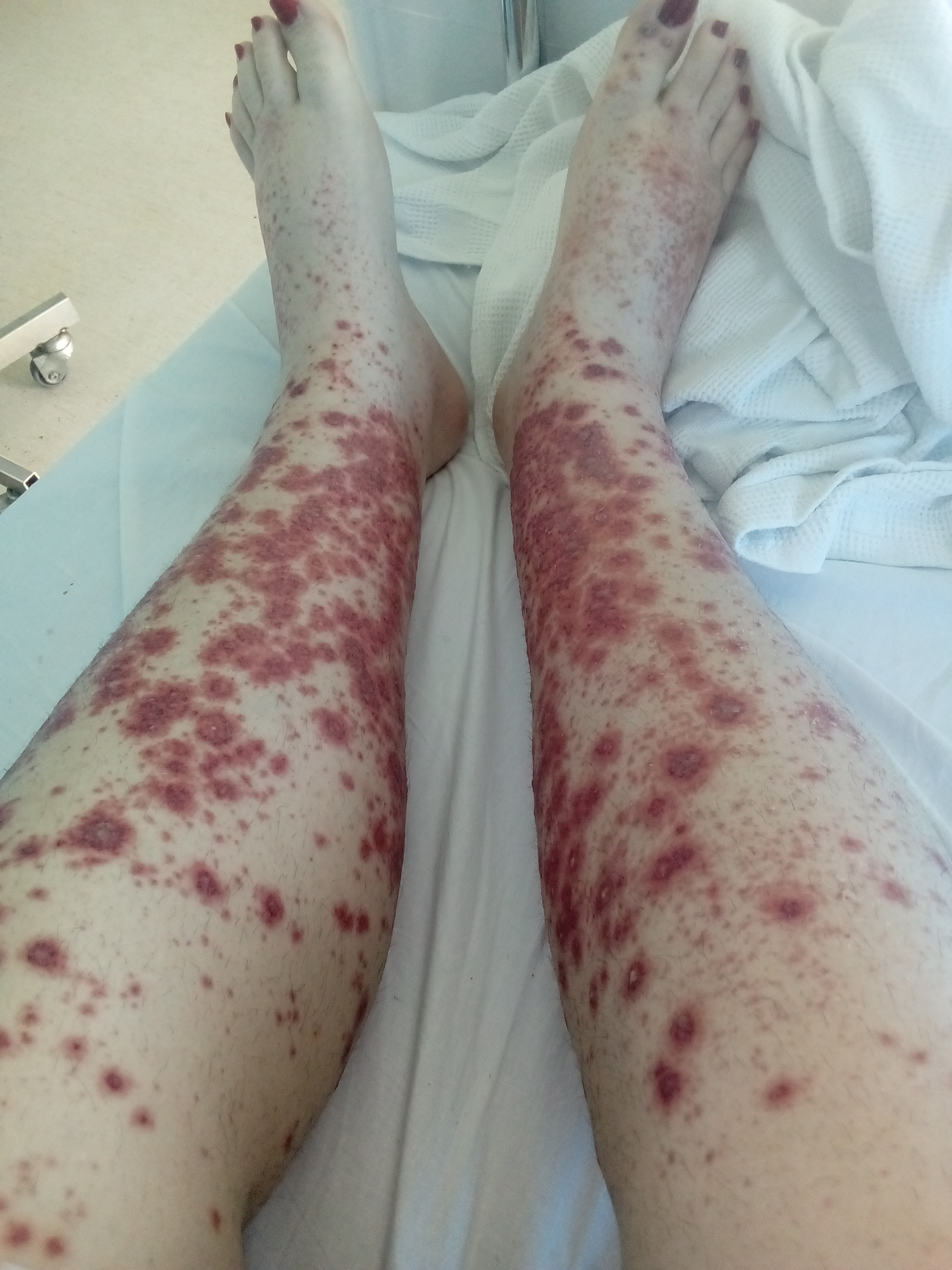
- A case of vasculitis on legs
- Specialty: Immunology, rheumatology

Necrotizing vasculitis, also called systemic necrotizing vasculitis, is a general term for the inflammation of veins and arteries that develops into necrosis and narrows the vessels.

Tumors, medications, allergic reactions, and infectious organisms are among the recognized triggers for these conditions, though the precise cause of many is unknown. Immune complex disease, anti-neutrophil cytoplasmic antibodies, anti-endothelial cell antibodies, and cell-mediated immunity are examples of pathogenetic factors.

Numerous secondary symptoms of vasculitis can occur, such as blood clots, the formation of weak bulging areas in blood vessel walls (aneurysms), bleeding, blockage (occlusion) of an artery, unintentional weight loss, exhaustion, depression, fever, and widespread pain that worsens in the morning.

Systemic vasculitides are categorized as small, medium, large, or variable based on the diameter of the blood vessel they primarily affect.

== Classification ==
=== Large-vessel vasculitis ===
The 2012 Chapel Hill Consensus Conference defines large vessel vasculitis (LVV) as a type of vasculitis that can affect any size artery, but usually affects the aorta and its major branches more frequently than other vasculitides. Takayasu's arteritis (TA) and giant cell arteritis (GCA) are the two main forms of LVV.

Takayasu's arteritis (TA) is a large-vessel, granulomatous arteritis of unknown cause that primarily affects the aorta, significant branches of it, and (less frequently) the pulmonary arteries. The disease's symptoms can range from catastrophic neurological impairment to an asymptomatic condition brought on by impalpable pulses or bruits. Non-specific features include mild anemia, muscle pain, joint pain, unintentional weight loss, generally feeling unwell, night sweats, and fever.

Giant cell arteritis (GCA) is the most common type of systemic vasculitis in adults. Polymyalgia rheumatica (PMR), headache, jaw claudication, and visual symptoms are the classic manifestations; however, 40% of patients present with a variety of occult manifestations.

=== Medium vessel vasculitis ===
Medium vessel vasculitis is a type of vasculitis that mostly affects the medium-sized arteries, which are the major arteries that supply the organs and their branches. Any size artery could be impacted, though. The two primary types are polyarteritis nodosa and Kawasaki disease.

Polyarteritis nodosa is a type of systemic necrotizing vasculitis that primarily affects medium-sized arteries. While small vessels like arterioles, capillaries, and venules are not affected, small arteries can be. The disease spectrum varies from failure of multiple organs to involvement of a single organ. Almost any organ can be affected; however, polyarteritis nodosa rarely affects the lungs for unknown reasons.

Kawasaki disease is a type of systemic vasculitis of medium-sized vessels with an acute onset that primarily affects young children. Fever, conjunctivitis, infection of the skin and mucous membranes, and swollen lymph node glands in the neck are the main signs and symptoms.

=== Small vessel vasculitis ===
Small vessel vasculitis (SVV) is separated into immune complex SVV and antineutrophil cytoplasmic antibody (ANCA)-associated vasculitis (AAV).

ANCA-associated vasculitis is a necrotizing vasculitis linked to MPO-ANCA or PR3-ANCA that primarily affects small vessels and has few or no immune deposits. AAV is further classified as eosinophilic granulomatosis with polyangiitis, granulomatosis with polyangiitis, and microscopic polyangiitis.

Eosinophilic granulomatosis with polyangiitis is a systemic small-vessel vasculitis linked to eosinophilia and asthma. Polyneuropathy, heart involvement, skin lesions, involvement of the upper respiratory tract, and lung are typical presentations of eosinophilic granulomatosis with polyangiitis.

Granulomatosis with polyangiitis is a rare immune-mediated systemic disease. Its cause is unknown. It manifests pathologically as an inflammatory response pattern in the kidneys, upper and lower respiratory tracts, and granulomatous inflammation, which includes cell death (necrosis).

Microscopic polyangiitis belongs to the group of vasculitides associated with ANCA. Its distinct histology reveals a pauci-immune vasculitis, or necrotizing small vessel vasculitis, with minimal or no immune deposits. The most typical features of microscopic polyangiitis are kidney manifestations and general symptoms; lung involvement is also frequently observed.

Immune complex small vessel vasculitis (SVV) is a vasculitis that primarily affects small vessels and has moderate to significant immunoglobulin and complement component deposits on the vessel wall. Hypocomplementemic urticarial vasculitis, cryoglobulinemic vasculitis, IgA vasculitis, and anti-glomerular basement membrane disease are the categories of immune complex SVV.

Hypocomplementemic urticarial vasculitis syndrome is a rare immune complex-mediated condition involving persistent acquired low levels of complement in the bloodstream and hives. Many systemic manifestations are linked to hypocomplementemic urticarial vasculitis syndrome, such as leukocytoclastic vasculitis, glomerulonephritis, swelling of the larynx, severe angioedema, lung involvement, arthritis, joint pain, and uveitis.

Cryoglobulinemic vasculitis is a type of small-vessel vasculitis that primarily affects the kidneys, skin, joints, and peripheral nervous system. Monoclonal immunoglobulins associated with an underlying B-cell lymphoproliferative disorder are known as type I cryovalent vasculitis. Cryoglobulins type II and III, also known as mixed cryoglobulinemia, are composed of polyclonal immunoglobulin (Ig)G and either monoclonal IgM or both with rheumatoid factor activity. The disease can present with a wide range of symptoms, including fatigue, purpura, or joint pain, to more serious complications, such as glomerulonephritis and widespread vasculitis, which can be fatal.

Immunoglobulin A (IgA) vasculitis, formerly referred to as Henoch–Schönlein purpura, is a type of immune complex vasculitis that primarily affects IgA deposits in small vessels. Acute enteritis, glomerulonephritis, arthralgias and/or arthritis, and cutaneous purpura are the most common clinical manifestations. Children are more likely than adults to develop IgA vasculitis. Adults tend to have a more severe case.

Anti-glomerular basement membrane disease is an uncommon kind of small vessel vasculitis that affects the kidney and lung capillary beds. This illness is also known by its eponym, "Goodpasture syndrome".

=== Variable vessel vasculitis ===
Variable vessel vasculitis is a kind of vasculitis that may impact vessels of all sizes (small, medium, and large) and any type (arteries, veins, and capillaries), with no particular type of vessel being predominantly affected. This category includes Behçet's disease and Cogan syndrome.

Behçet's disease is a systemic illness marked by frequent episodes of severe inflammation. Genital ulcers, inflammation of the uvea of the eye, oral aphthous ulcers (canker sores), and skin lesions are the main symptoms.

Cogan syndrome is an uncommon type of autoimmune systemic vasculitis that causes inflammation in the eyes and malfunctions the vestibulo-auditory system, usually resulting in neurosensory deafness but also tinnitus and vertigo. An upper respiratory tract infection, or less frequently, diarrhea, a dental infection, or an immunization, precedes the onset of the disease.

== History ==
Kussmaul and Maier provided the first detailed description of systemic necrotizing arteritis in 1866.

In 1919 Karl Theodor Fahr described acute arterial lesions which were always present in malignant nephrosclerosis. These injuries were the most severe and widespread in the kidneys and occurred less frequently and severely in other organs, particularly in the pancreas, adrenal glands, and intestines. Fahr believed that necrotizing arteriolitis was the primary cause of the lesions, malignant necrosis, and high blood pressure in these cases by narrowing the kidney vascular bed.

== Signs and symptoms ==
Prodromal symptoms, constitutional abnormalities, and organ-specific manifestations are common in vasculitis patients. Patients may show up at the emergency room with life-threatening symptoms (such as coughing up massive amounts of blood or kidney failure) or with nonspecific signs and symptoms (such as a rash, fever, muscle pain, joint pain, a general sense of feeling unwell, or unintentional weight loss) at their family physician's office. The size, location, and extent of the vessels involved all affect the manifestations.

Takayasu's arteritis (TA) is typically documented in three distinct phases. Constitutional inflammatory symptoms are often present during the first stage. Patients may report fever of unknown cause during this phase. Patients may refer to dorsal and thoracic pain in the following phase, and infrequently, neck pain as well. Arterial bruits, intermittent extremity claudication, decreased or absent pulses, and/or variations in arterial blood pressure among upper extremities are the hallmarks of the final phase.

Giant cell arteritis (GCA) often exhibits a wide range of symptoms in its early stages, all of which are related to the localized consequences of systemic and vascular inflammation. The symptoms of GCA include jaw claudication, headaches, and tenderness in the scalp. The most common symptom is headache, which is restricted to the temporal region.

Polyarteritis nodosa (PAN) can affect one organ or cause systemic failure as its clinical manifestation. Although any tissue may be impacted, PAN rarely affects the lungs for unclear reasons. A variety of clinical indicators, including common symptoms like fever, chills, weight loss, myalgia, and arthralgia, are typically present when PAN first manifests. Peripheral nerves and skin are typically involved in PAN. Skin manifestations include purpura, necrotic ulcers, subcutaneous nodules, and livedoid. Mononeuritis multiplex is the main neurological symptom, typically presenting as a drop in the foot or wrist.

Patients with Kawasaki disease often have a fever between 38 and 40 degrees Celsius and often show no prodromal symptoms. Within two to four days of the illness starting, bilateral conjunctival injections without exudate become visible. The term "modifications of the oral cavity" usually refers to conditions such as diffuse erythema of the oropharyngeal mucosa, strawberry-like tongue without vesicles or pseudo-membrane formation, bleeding of the lips, redness, fissuring, and dryness. From the first to the fifth day following the onset of fever, polymorphous erythema appears on the body and/or extremities.

Malaise, joint pain, sinusitis, and rhinitis are typically present at the beginning of Anti-neutrophil cytoplasmic antibody (ANCA)-associated vasculitis. Prodromes often occur weeks or months before pulmonary-renal syndrome.

Anti-glomerular basement membrane vasculitis patients usually report sudden onset of anuria or oliguria. Typically, hematuria or tea-colored urine are noticed.

Many cases of cryoglobulinemic vasculitis are asymptomatic. Hyperviscosity and/or thrombosis are the principal signs and symptoms of type I cryoglobulinemia. As a result, the conditions most frequently manifested as Raynaud's phenomenon, distal gangrene, ischemic ulcers, purpura, livedo reticularis, headache, retinal hemorrhages, and encephalopathy. Nonspecific systemic and musculoskeletal symptoms, such as cutaneous vasculitis and neuropathy, can also be seen in patients with mixed cryoglobulinemia.

Ninety-five percent of cases of immunoglobulin A vasculitis start with a skin rash. Additionally, the illness manifests as the standard tripartite of symptoms of the gastrointestinal, kidney, and musculoskeletal systems.

Recurrent urticaria, with skin eruptions primarily affecting the trunk, face, and upper extremities, is the primary clinical manifestation of hypocomplementemic urticarial vasculitis.

Canker sores of the mouth are the defining feature of Behçet's disease and manifest in 98% of patients. Compared to oral lesions, genital aphthae are less common.

Often, the upper respiratory tract infection is the initial sign of Cogan's syndrome. Ocular and audio-vestibular symptoms are typical indicators. Non-syphilitic interstitial keratitis (IK), uveitis, retinal vasculitis, conjunctivitis, scleritis, tinnitus, hearing loss, and vertigo are among the range of ocular manifestations.

== Diagnosis ==
To confirm the diagnosis, the initial evaluation consists of a thorough clinical assessment, serological tests, histology when possible, and radiography when necessary.

Individuals experiencing active vasculitis frequently exhibit low levels of red blood cells and platelets in the bloodstream, and high levels of white blood cells in the blood. One of the main characteristics of eosinophilic granulomatosis with polyangiitis is eosinophilia.

Patients with vasculitis frequently have increased erythrocyte sedimentation rate and elevated C-reactive protein levels; however, these symptoms are nonspecific and can arise in a variety of circumstances, most notably infection. When vasculitis is inactive, normal erythrocyte sedimentation rate or C-reactive protein levels can occur and should not rule out the diagnosis. When paired with congruent clinical features, an elevated erythrocyte sedimentation rate in giant cell arteritis can both support the diagnosis and aid in disease monitoring.

In any patient suspected of having vasculitis, measurements of blood urea nitrogen, serum creatinine, and urine should be taken. Blood and protein in the urine increase the risk that glomerulonephritis is present. Serum bilirubin and liver enzyme levels (ó-glutamyltransferase, alkaline phosphatase, and aspartate and alanine transaminase) can give indications for liver-related vasculitis, like polyarteritis nodosa.

Antineutrophil cytoplasmic antibodies (ANCAs) are a diverse collection of autoantibodies that target neutrophil enzymes and have been detected in the serum of many vasculitis patients. The conditions known as ANCA-associated vasculitides, which are characterized by circulating ANCAs, comprise granulomatosis with polyangiitis, microscopic polyangiitis, and eosinophilic granulomatosis with polyangiitis.

Chest X-rays may reveal nonspecific abnormalities such as an enlarged heart, patchy consolidation, nodules, and infiltrates. These results can happen in a variety of situations, but if they go undiagnosed, they could suggest vasculitis.

Bulges in the blood vessel walls (aneurysms) and blocked blood vessels can be seen with angiography. Polyarteritis nodosa can be verified by looking for aneurysms in the renal and mesenteric arteries. While conventional angiography remains the accepted standard diagnostic modality, computed tomography angiography and magnetic resonance angiography may be superior, as they can provide important insights into intraluminal pathology and vessel wall thickening. These methods have been applied to Kawasaki disease and Takayasu arteritis diagnosis and follow-up.

When Kawasaki disease is present, transthoracic echocardiography can identify coronary artery abnormalities. [chocardiography reveals coronary artery lesions (ectasia or aneurysm) in about 40% of children with Kawasaki disease. In patients with Takayasu arteritis, echocardiography is used to measure the degree of coronary stenosis and coronary artery blood flow.

For the diagnosis and ongoing monitoring of large-vessel vasculitis, ultrasound may be helpful. Individuals diagnosed with giant cell arteritis may present with superficial temporal artery narrowing, blockage (occlusion), or halo sign (a dark patch surrounding the artery due to vessel wall swelling).

When diagnosing patients with granulomatosis with polyangiitis, computed tomography is useful. Results include destruction of punctate bone, primarily in the midline, and thickening of the nasal mucosa. In about 90% of patients with granulomatosis with polyangiitis, a chest computed tomography scan will show nodules or masses.

Systemic vasculitides, such as polyarteritis nodosa, granulomatosis with polyangiitis, and eosinophilic granulomatosis with polyangiitis, can result in motor and sensory neuropathy. Neurological manifestations should be evaluated by nerve conduction testing.

A sample (biopsy) of the affected tissue (such as the skin, the sinuses, lung, artery, nerve, or kidney) is used to make a definitive diagnosis of vasculitis by identifying the pattern of vessel inflammation. Determining the precise type of vasculitis may be made easier by searching for immunoglobulins and complement on sectioned tissue with immunofluorescence. Although a negative biopsy cannot rule out vasculitis, biopsies are especially useful in ruling out other causes.

== Treatment ==
Treatment is targeted at the underlying cause. However, most vasculitides are treated with corticosteroid medications (e.g., methylprednisolone), since the underlying cause of the vasculitis is due to hyperactive immune system-mediated damage. Immunosuppressants, such as cyclophosphamide and azathioprine, may also be given.

A systematic review of antineutrophil cytoplasmic antibody-positive vasculitides identified the best treatments depending on whether the goal is to induce or maintain remission and the severity of the vasculitides.
