= Cryoglobulinemia =

Clumping of abnormal cold-sensitive proteins in blood

- Other names: Cryoglobulinaemia, cryoglobulinemic disease
- Purpuric skin lesions seen in a person with cryoglobulinemia
- Specialty: Hematology

Cryoglobulinemia is a rare medical condition characterized by the presence of cryoglobulins in the blood. Cryoglobulins are abnormal proteins composed of immunoglobulins and sometimes complement components. Cryoglobulins specifically form gel-like solids by clumping together and becoming insoluble at temperatures below 37 °C.

In the human body, these cryoglobulins precipitate together in small- and medium-sized blood vessels causing occlusions and triggering inflammatory reactions. This leads to a range of symptoms, including joint pain, skin rashes, and kidney problems.

Cryoglobulinemia is classified into three groups. Type I cryoglobulinemia has only monoclonal proteins, developing in lymphoproliferative disorders. Type II cryoglobulinemia is the most common, occurring when both monoclonal and polyclonal proteins are present in the bloodstream and is usually linked to chronic Hepatitis C infection. Type III cryoglobulinemia has only polyclonal proteins and is often linked to autoimmune diseases. These cryoglobulins are not to be confused with cold agglutinins, which cause agglutination of red blood cells. Cryoglobulins typically precipitate below normal human body temperature (37 °C (99 °F)) and dissolve again if the blood is heated. The precipitated clump can block blood vessels and cause extremities to become gangrenous.

Type 1 cryoglobulinemia and types 2 and 3 represent two distinct clinical entities with different pathophysiological mechanisms. In type 1 cryoglobulinemia, high concentrations of monoclonal immunoglobulins can increase blood viscosity and promote red blood cell aggregation (rouleaux formation), while the cryoglobulins themselves precipitate directly into intravascular hyaline plugs and microthrombi that occlude small- and medium-sized blood vessels. In contrast, types 2 and 3 cryoglobulinemia involve immune complexes that trigger classical complement pathway activation, resulting in an inflammatory leukocytoclastic vasculitis.

The main causes of cryoglobulinemia are Waldenstrom's macroglobulinemia, multiple myeloma, Non-Hodgkin's lymphoma, chronic lymphocytic leukemia (CLL), monoclonal gammopathy of clinical significance, lupus, Sjogren's syndrome, rheumatoid arthritis and chronic viral infections including hepatitis C (most commonly in type 2 disease), hepatitis B and HIV.

While this disease is commonly referred to as cryoglobulinemia in the medical literature, Retamozo et al. argue it is better termed cryoglobulinemic disease for two reasons: cryoglobulinemia is also used to indicate the circulation of (usually low levels of) cryoglobulins in the absence of any symptoms or disease, and healthy individuals can develop transient asymptomatic cryoglobulinemia following certain infections.

In contrast to these benign instances of circulating cryoglobulins, cryoglobulinemic disease involves the signs and symptoms of precipitating cryoglobulins, commonly associated with various pre-malignant, malignant, infectious, or autoimmune diseases that are the underlying cause for the production of the cryoglobulins.

== Classification ==
Since the first description of cryoglobulinemia in association with the clinical triad of purpura, joint pain, and weakness by Meltzer et al. in 1966, the percentage of cryoglobulinemic diseases described as essential cryoglobulinemia or idiopathic cryoglobulinemia (cryoglobulinemic disease that is unassociated with an underlying disorder) has fallen. Currently, most cases of this disease are found to be associated with premalignant, malignant, infectious, or autoimmune disorders that are the known or presumed causes for the production of cryoglobulins. This form of non-essential or non-idiopathic cryoglobulinemic disease is classically grouped into three types according to the Brouet classification. The classification distinguishes the subtypes of cryoglobulinemic diseases based on two factors: the class of immunoglobulins in the cryoglobulin and the association of the cryoglobulinemic disease with other disorders. The following table lists these three types of cryoglobulinemic disease, characterized by the monoclonal immunoglobulin(s) comprising the involved cryoglobulin, the percentage of total cryoglobulinemic disease cases, and class of disorders associated with each type.

Type	Composition	Percentage of cases	Association with other diseases
Type I	Monoclonal IgG, IgM, IgA, or their κ or λ light chains	10–15%	Hematological diseases, particularly MGUS, smoldering multiple myeloma, multiple myeloma, Waldenström's macroglobulinemia, and chronic lymphocytic leukemia
Type II	Monoclonal IgM plus polyclonal IgG or, rarely, IgA	50–60%	Infectious diseases, particularly hepatitis C infection, HIV infection, and Hepatitis C and HIV coinfection; hematological diseases particularly B cell disorders; autoimmune diseases
Type III	Polyclonal IgM plus polyclonal IgG or IgA	25–30%	Autoimmune diseases, particularly Sjögren syndrome and less commonly systemic lupus erythematosus and rheumatoid arthritis; infectious diseases particularly HCV infection

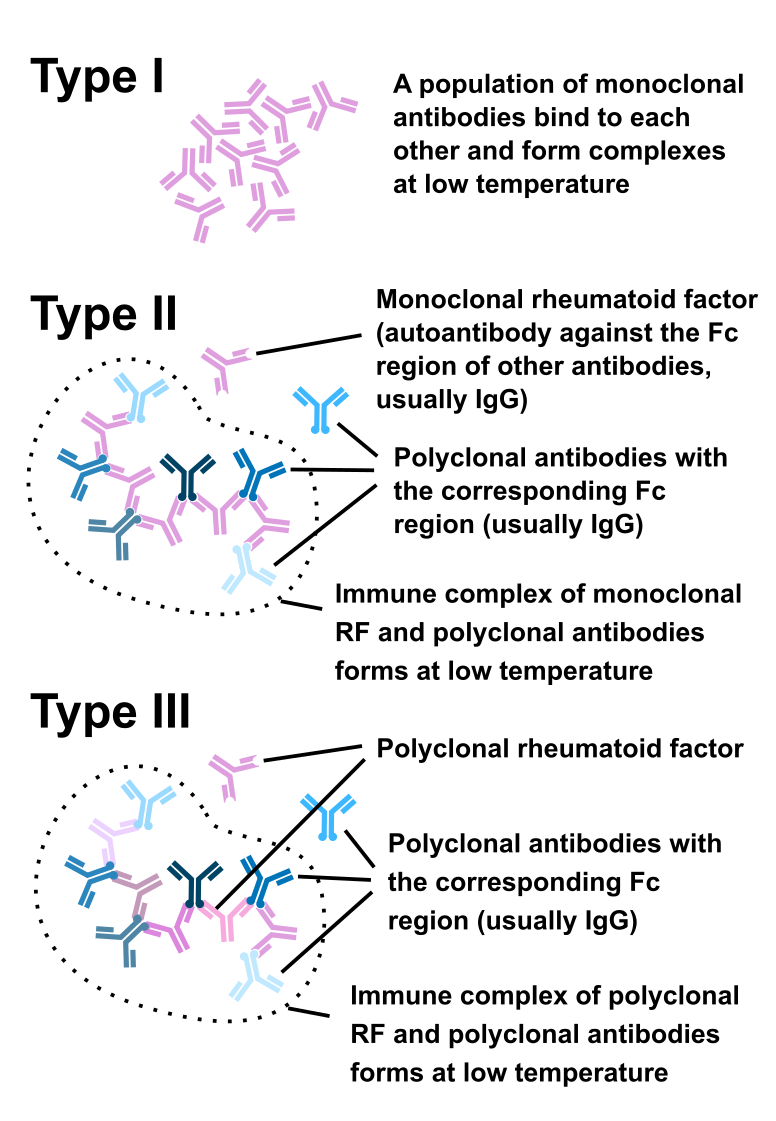
The three types of cryoglobulin by Brouet classification. In Type I, monoclonal Ig (either intact Ig or just free light chain) self-associates and forms complexes at low temperature. Type II is a complex of monoclonal rheumatoid factor (autoantibody against the Fc region of many antibodies) and normal serum antibodies. Type III is the same as Type II except that the rheumatoid factor is polyclonal.

The monoclonal or polyclonal IgM proteins involved in Types II and III cryoglobulinemic disease have rheumatoid factor activity, meaning they bind to polyclonal immunoglobulins and activate the blood complement system. They therefore form tissue deposits that contain IgM, IgG or, rarely, IgA, and components of the complement system, including in particular complement component 4. The vascular deposition of these types of cryoglobulin-containing immune complexes and complements can cause a clinical syndrome of cutaneous small-vessel vasculitis characterized by systemic vasculitis and inflammation termed cryoglobulinemic vasculitis. Accordingly, type II and type III cryoglobulinemic diseases are often grouped together and referred to as mixed cryoglobulinemia or mixed cryoglobulinemic disease. The monoclonal IgM involved in Type I cryoglobulinemic diseases lacks rheumatoid factor activity.

More recent high-resolution protein electrophoresis methods have detected a small monoclonal immunoglobulin component in type III cryoglobulins, a micro-heterogeneous composition of oligoclonal (i.e., more than one monoclonal) immunoglobulin components, and immunoglobulins with structures that do not fit into any classifications in the cryoglobulins of approximately 10% of type II and III disease cases. It has been proposed that these cases be termed an intermediate type II-III variant of cryoglobulinemic disease. Furthermore, it has also been proposed that some of the type III cases associated with the expression of low levels of one or more isotypes of circulating monoclonal immunoglobulin(s) are in transition to type II disease.

== Epidemiology ==
The prevalence of mixed cryoglobulinemia is estimated at approximately 1 in 100,000 individuals, although geographical variations exist with higher rates reported in Southern Europe and the Mediterranean basin compared to Northern Europe or North America.

Mixed cryoglobulinemia displays a marked female predominance, with a female-to-male ratio of approximately 2:1 to 3:1. Clinical presentation most commonly manifests in the fourth to sixth decades of life. In contrast, Type I cryoglobulinemia exhibits no clear sex predilection, occurring with equal frequency in men and women, and presents primarily in older demographics reflecting the incidence patterns of underlying lymphoproliferative disorders.

== Signs and symptoms ==
The clinical features of cryoglobulinemic disease can appear due to the circulation of cryoglobulins. They can also appear due to an underlying hematological disorder, infectious disease, or autoimmune syndrome that contributed to the cryoglobulinemia. Clinical symptoms are diverse, as cryoglobulinemia may affect any organ system.

In type 1 disease, increased blood viscosity (hyperviscosity syndrome) reducing blood flow to tissues, may cause headache, confusion, blurry or loss of vision, hearing loss, coma, incoordination (ataxia) or strokes. Bleeding from mucosal surfaces, such as the nose, mouth or vaginal area is possible.

In type 2 or 3 disease, immunoglobulin and complement deposition in small arteries and capillaries causes vasculitis, thereby initiating the systemic vascular inflammatory reaction termed cryoglobulinemic vasculitis.

Purpura seen in cryoglobulinemia may also be referred to as cryoglobulinemic purpura. Type 1 cryoglobulinemic disease usually presents with skin findings linked to external cold temperatures whereas skin findings in type 2 and 3 disease are linked to physical exertion or prolonged standing. Extremity hypoperfusion in type 1 disease may cause Raynaud phenomenon or damage to extremities, such as fingers, hands and toes.

Kidney disease in cryoglobulinemia presents as nephrotic range proteinuria, hematuria, kidney failure and high blood pressure. Symptoms due to kidney disease are similar in type 1 and type 2 or 3 disease. Type 2 or 3 cryoglobulinemic kidney disease usually presents as membranoproliferative glomerulonephritis with immune globulin and complement deposition in the glomerular basement membrane.

=== Essential cryoglobulinemic disease ===
The signs and symptoms in the increasingly rare cases of cryoglobulinemic disease that cannot be attributed to an underlying disease generally resemble those of patients suffering Type II and III (i.e., mixed) cryoglobulinemic disease.

=== Type I cryoglobulinemic disease ===
Signs and symptoms due to the cryoglobulins of type I disease reflect the hyperviscosity and deposition of cryoglobulins within the blood vessels which form blood clots, which reduce or stop blood perfusion to tissues. The interruption of blood flow to neurological tissues can cause symptoms of confusion, headache, hearing loss, and peripheral neuropathy. Interruption of blood flow to other tissues in type I disease can cause cutaneous manifestations of purpura, blue discoloration of the arms or legs (acrocyanosis), necrosis, ulcers, and livedo reticularis; spontaneous nose bleeds, joint pain, membranoproliferative glomerulonephritis; and cardiovascular disturbances such as shortness of breath, inadequate levels of oxygen in the blood (hypoxemia), and congestive heart failure.

=== Types II and III cryoglobulinemic disease ===
Types II and III cryoglobulinemic disease present with deposition of cryoglobulins within blood vessels and activation of inflammatory cascades, including those of complement, leading to cryoglobulinemic vasculitis. "Meltzer's triad" of palpable purpura, joint pain, and generalized weakness occurs in ≈33% of patients presenting with type II or type III disease. One or more skin lesions including palpable purpura, ulcers, digital gangrene, and areas of necrosis occur in 69-89% of these mixed disease cases; less common findings include painful peripheral neuropathy (often manifesting as mononeuritis multiplex in 19-44% of cases), kidney disease (primarily membranoproliferative glomerulonephritis (30%), joint pain (28%), and, less commonly, dry eye syndrome and Raynaud phenomenon (i.e., episodic painful reductions in blood flow to the fingers and toes). While the glomerulonephritis occurring in mixed disease appears to be due to inflammatory vasculitis, the glomerulonephritis occurring in type I disease appears due to the interruption of blood flow.

== Mechanism ==
=== Cryoglobulins ===
Cryoglobulins consist of one or more of the following components: monoclonal or polyclonal IgM, IgG, IgA antibodies, monoclonal κ, or λ free light chain portions of these antibodies, and proteins of the blood complement system, particularly complement component 4 (C4). The particular components involved are a reflection of the disorders that are associated with, and considered to be the cause of, the cryoglobulinemic disease. The cryoglobulin compositions and disorder associations in cryoglobulinemic disease are as follows:

- Monoclonal IgM-based cryoglobulin occurs in cases of Waldenström's macroglobulinemia and the pre-malignant precursors to this cancer, IgM monoclonal gammopathy of undetermined significance and smoldering Waldenstrom's macroglobulinemia.
- Monoclonal IgG or, rarely, IgA, κ light chain, or λ light chain cryoglobulins occur in cases of multiple myeloma and the pre-malignant precursors to this cancer, non-IgM monoclonal gammopathy of undetermined significance and non-IgM smoldering multiple myeloma. Non-IgM monoclonal immunoglobulin-based cases of cryoglobulinemic disease are less commonly associated with other B-cell lymphocytic diseases viz., Non-Hodgkin lymphoma, Hodgkin lymphoma, B-cell chronic lymphocytic leukemia, and Castleman disease; they occur rarely in non-B cell hematological disorders such as myelodysplastic syndromes and chronic myelogenous leukemia. Among these purely monoclonal immunoglobulin causes of cryoglobulinemic disease, Waldenström macroglobulinemia and multiple myeloma together account for ≈40% of cases; their pre-malignant precursors account for ≈44% of cases; and the other cited hematological diseases account for ≈16% of cases.
- Mixtures of monoclonal or polyclonal IgM, IgG, and/or IgA along with blood complement proteins such as C4 are the cryoglobulins associated with cases of infectious diseases, particularly hepatitis C infection, HIV infection, and Hepatitis C and HIV coinfection, and, less commonly or rarely, with cases of other infectious diseases such as hepatitis B infection, hepatitis A infection, cytomegalovirus infection, Epstein–Barr virus infection, Lyme disease, syphilis, lepromatous leprosy, Q fever, poststreptococcal nephritis, subacute bacterial endocarditis, coccidioidomycosis, malaria, schistosomiasis, echinococcosis, toxoplasmosis, and Kala-azar. These mixed-protein cryoglobulins are also associated with autoimmune diseases, particularly Sjögren syndrome, less commonly systemic lupus erythematosus and rheumatoid arthritis, and rarely polyarteritis nodosa, systemic sclerosis, temporal arteritis, polymyositis, Henoch–Schönlein purpura, pemphigus vulgaris, sarcoidosis, inflammatory bowel diseases, and others. In these mixed-protein depositions, the monoclonal or polyclonal IgM typically possesses rheumatoid factor activity, and therefore binds to the Fc region of polyclonal IgG antibodies, activates the blood complement system, and complexes with complement components to form precipitates composed of IgM and IgG or IgG and complement components, particularly complement component 4 (C4).
  - In mixed disease (type 2 or 3 cryoglobulinemia) over 50% of cases are due to systemic lupus erythematosus and Sjogren's syndrome and less commonly other autoimmune diseases. Hepatitis C is less prevalent as a cause of mixed disease owing to effective viral treatments for hepatitis C. Successful cure of hepatitis C usually resolves type 2 or 3 mixed cryoglobulinemic disease. However, 12.6% of people may have relapsed cryoglobulinemic disease after treatment of hepatitis C. In this case, persistent circulating cryoglobulins after successful hepatitis C treatment indicates persistent disease.

== Diagnosis ==
Cold induced precipitates on serum testing, hypergammaglobulinemia (with a monoclonal spike on serum protein electrophoresis in Type 1 disease with monoclonal immunoglobulins or the monoclonal component of type 2 disease), complement consumption (low C4 and CH50 levels) in types 2 and 3 disease and rheumatoid factor activity (in types 2 or 3 disease) along with clinical signs and symptoms suggest a diagnosis of cryoglobulinemia.

Cryoglobulinemia and cryoglobulinemic disease must be distinguished from cryofibrinogenemia or cryofibrinogenemic disease, conditions that involve the cold-induced intravascular deposition of circulating native fibrinogens. These molecules precipitate at lower temperatures (e.g., 4 °C). Since cryofibrinogens are present in plasma but greatly depleted in serum, precipitation tests for them are positive in plasma but negative in serum. Cryofibrinogenemia is occasionally found in cases of cryoglobulinemic disease. Cryoglobulinemic disease must also be distinguished from frostbite as well as numerous other conditions that have a clinical (particularly cutaneous) presentation similar to cryoglobulinemic disease but are not exacerbated by cold temperature, e.g., dysfibrinogenemia and dysfibrinogenemic disease (conditions involving the intravascular deposition of genetically abnormal circulating fibrinogens), purpura fulminans, cholesterol emboli, warfarin necrosis, ecthyma gangrenosum, and various hypercoagulable states.

Rheumatoid factor is a sensitive test for cryoglobulinemia. The precipitated cryoglobulins are examined by immunoelectrophoresis and immunofixation to detect and quantify the presence of monoclonal IgG, IgM, IgA, κ light chain, or λ light chain immunoglobins. Other routine tests include measuring blood levels of rheumatoid factor activity, complement C4, other complement components, and hepatitis C antigen. Biopsies of skin lesions and, where indicated, kidney or other tissues can help in determining the nature of the vascular disease (immunoglobulin deposition, cryoglobulinemic vasculitis, or, in cases showing the presence of cryofibrinogenemia, fibrinogen deposition). In all events, further studies to determine the presence of hematological, infections, and autoimmune disorders are conducted on the basis of these findings as well as each case's clinical findings.

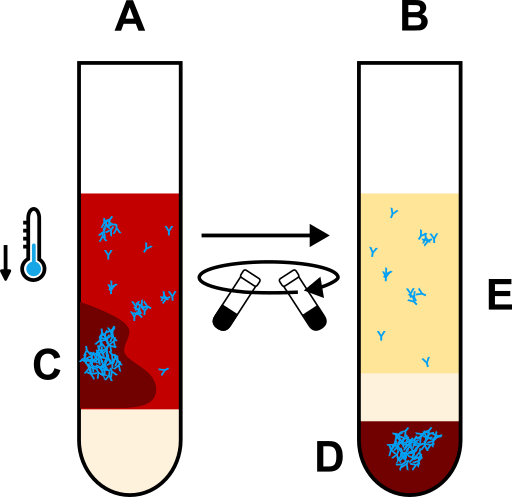
The reason for stringent cryoglobulin collection requirements. This diagram represents the spinning of clotted blood, showing how cryoglobulins (small blue 'Y's), if allowed to precipitate while the blood is clotting, become trapped in clot and then will be spun out, giving a falsely low/negative cryoglobulin result. This is prevented by keeping the cryoglobulins soluble, by keeping the sample at 37 °C until spun.

Biopsy of cutaneous purpuric lesions in type II and type III (mixed) cryoglobulinemia typically demonstrates a leukocytoclastic vasculitis involving post-capillary venules and small dermal arterioles. Histopathological hallmarks include endothelial swelling, fibrinoid necrosis of the vessel wall, extravasation of erythrocytes, and a dense perivascular infiltrate composed predominantly of neutrophils exhibiting karyorrhexis (leukocytoclasia or "nuclear dusting"). In older or resolving lesions, a transition toward a mononuclear (lymphocytic and histiocytic) perivascular infiltrate may be observed. Direct immunofluorescence routinely demonstrates vascular deposition of immunoglobulins (IgM, IgG) and complement component C3. In contrast, biopsy of affected tissues in type I disease demonstrates non-inflammatory intraluminal thrombosis and hyaline precipitates occluding vascular lumina without prominent leukocytoclastic necrosis.

=== Laboratory testing ===
Serum samples for cryoglobulin testing need to be collected at 37 °C and kept at 37 °C until the sample is spun. The reason for this is that if allowed to precipitate before spinning, some of the cross-linked precipitated cryoglobulin will become permanently trapped in the clot and subsequently spun out during centrifugation. By keeping the cryoglobulin soluble, it will not be spun out with clot during centrifugation.

=== Laboratory quantification and profiling ===
Once the serum is separated at 37 °C, diagnostic evaluation requires quantitative and qualitative analysis:

- Cryocrit measurement: Serum is incubated at 4 °C for up to seven days in a graduated Wintrobe tube to allow complete cryoprecipitation. The tube is then centrifuged at 4 °C, and the volume of the precipitate is expressed as a percentage of the total serum volume (the cryocrit). In healthy individuals, the cryocrit is 0%. Type I disease typically presents with high cryocrits (>5% to >10%), whereas mixed cryoglobulinemia (types II and III) frequently presents with low cryocrits (often 1% to 5%), despite severe clinical vasculitis.
- Immunochemical typing: The cryoprecipitate is washed repeatedly at 4 °C to remove contaminating serous proteins, redissolved at 37 °C, and evaluated via immunofixation electrophoresis to determine monoclonal versus polyclonal composition and immunoglobulin isotypes.
- Complement profile: Classical pathway complement activation in types II and III disease produces a characteristic serological pattern: marked reduction of complement component 4 (C4) and total hemolytic complement (CH50), typically with normal or only mildly depressed levels of complement component 3 (C3).

== Treatment ==
All patients with symptomatic cryoglobulinemia are advised to protect their extremities from exposure to cold temperatures, especially refrigerators, freezers, and air-conditioning. Such exposure can be very dangerous.

=== Asymptomatic cryoglobulinemia ===
Individuals found to have circulating cryoglobulins but no signs or symptoms of cryoglobulinemic diseases should be evaluated for the possibility that their cryoglobulinemia is a transient response to a recent or resolving infection. Those with a history of recent infection who also have a spontaneous and full resolution of their cryoglobulinemia need no further treatment. Individuals without a history of infection and not showing resolution of their cryoglobulinemia need to be further evaluated. Their cryoglobulins should be analyzed to determine their immunoglobulin type(s) and complement component(s) and assessed for the presence of premalignant and malignant diseases associated with Type I disease, as well as infectious and autoimmune diseases associated with Type II and Type III disease. A study conducted in Italy on more than 140 asymptomatic individuals found five cases of hepatitis C-related and one case of Hepatitis B-related cryoglobulinemia indicating that a complete clinical examination of asymptomatic individuals with cryoglobulinemia offers a means for finding people with serious but potentially treatable and even curable diseases. Individuals who show no evidence of a disease underlying their cryoglobulinemia and who remain asymptomatic should be monitored closely for any signs of developing cryoglobulinemic disease.

=== Severely symptomatic cryoglobulinemic disease ===
People affected by the severest, often life-threatening, complications of cryoglobulinemic disease require urgent plasmapharesis and/or plasma exchange in order to rapidly reduce the circulating levels of their cryoglobulins. Complications commonly requiring this intervention include: hyperviscosity disease with severe symptoms of neurological (e.g., stroke, mental impairment, and myelitis) and/or cardiovascular (e.g., congestive heart failure, myocardial infarction) disturbances; vasculitis-driven intestinal ischemia, intestinal perforation, cholecystitis, or pancreatitis, causing acute abdominal pain, general malaise, fever, and/or bloody bowel movements; vasculitis-driven pulmonary disturbances (e.g., coughing up blood, acute respiratory failure, X-ray evidence of diffuse pulmonary infiltrates caused by diffuse alveolar hemorrhage); and severe kidney dysfunction due to intravascular deposition of immunoglobulins or vasculitis. Along with this urgent treatment, severely symptomatic patients are commonly started on therapy to treat any underlying disease; this treatment is often supplemented with anti-inflammatory drugs such as corticosteroids (e.g., dexamethasone) and/or immunosuppressive drugs. Cases where no underlying disease is known are also often treated with corticosteroid and immunosuppressive medications.

=== Type I cryoglobulinemic disease ===
Treatment of Type I disease is generally directed towards treating the underlying pre-malignant or malignant disorder (such as plasma cell dyscrasia, Waldenström's macroglobulinemia, and chronic lymphocytic leukemia). This involves appropriate chemotherapy regimens which may include bortezomib (which promotes cell death by apoptosis in cells accumulating immunoglobulins) in patients with monoclonal immunoglobulin-induced kidney failure and rituximab (an antibody directed against CD20 surface antigen-bearing lymphocytes) in patients with Waldenstroms macroglobulinemia. Plasma exchanges may also be used. Bortezomib, anti-CD38 drugs such as daratumumab and isatuximab or immunosuppression with lenalidomide or thalidomide may be used in IgA or IgG disease, but treatment strategies are not well established and based on limited data or expert opinion.

Treating the underlying malignancy in type 1 disease is associated with symptom improvement and a 50% rate of resolution of cryoglobulins.

The 5 year survival rate of type 1 disease has been relatively unchanged, ranging from 77-83% from 1983 to 2018.

=== Type II and III cryoglobulinemic disease ===
Treatment of mixed cryoglobulinemic disease is, similar to type I disease, directed toward treating any underlying disorder. This includes malignant (particularly Waldenström's macroglobulinemia in type II disease), infectious, or autoimmune diseases in type II and III disease. The most effective therapy for hepatitis C-associated cryoglobulinemic disease consists of a combination of anti-viral drugs directed against hepatitis C and rituximab can be added to deplete B cells in severe or refractory disease. Data on the treatment of infectious causes other than hepatitis C for mixed disease are limited. A current recommendation treats the underlying disease with appropriate antiviral, anti-bacterial, or anti-fungal agents, if available; in cases refractory to an appropriate drug, the addition of immunosuppressive drugs to the therapeutic regimen may improve results. Mixed cryoglobulinemic disease associated with autoimmune disorders is treated with immunosuppressive drugs: a combination of a corticosteroid with either cyclophosphamide, azathioprine, or mycophenolate or combination of a corticosteroid with rituximab have been used successfully to treat mixed cryoglobulinemic disease associated with autoimmune disorders.

== See also ==
- Cryofibrinogenemia
- Cryoglobulinemic vasculitis
- Dysfibrinogenemia
- Hematopoietic ulcer
- Hyperviscosity syndrome
- Paraproteinemia
- Plasma cell dyscrasias
