= Hemosiderosis =

Medical condition, an iron metabolism disease

- Other names: Haemosiderosis
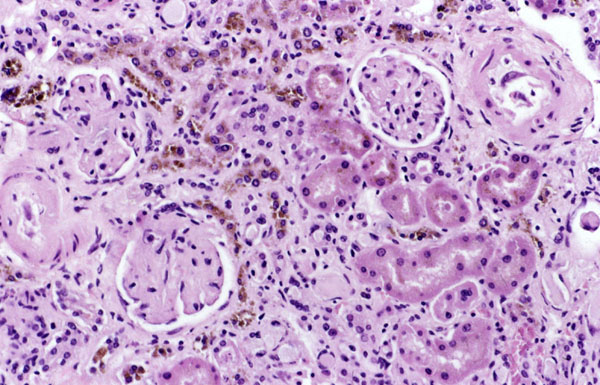
- Image of a kidney viewed under a microscope. The brown areas contain hemosiderin
- Specialty: Hematology

Hemosiderosis is a form of iron overload disorder resulting in the accumulation of hemosiderin.

Types include:

- Transfusion hemosiderosis
- Idiopathic pulmonary hemosiderosis
- Transfusional diabetes

Organs affected:

- Hemosiderin deposition in the lungs is often seen after diffuse alveolar hemorrhage, which occurs in diseases such as Goodpasture's syndrome, granulomatosis with polyangiitis, and idiopathic pulmonary hemosiderosis. Mitral stenosis can also lead to pulmonary hemosiderosis.
- Hemosiderin collects throughout the body in hemochromatosis.
- Hemosiderin deposition in the liver is a common feature of hemochromatosis and is the cause of liver failure in the disease.
- Selective iron deposition in the beta cells of pancreatic islets leads to diabetes due to the distribution of transferrin receptor on the beta cells of islets and in the skin leads to hyperpigmentation.
- Hemosiderin deposition in the brain is seen after bleeds from any source, including chronic subdural hemorrhage, cerebral arteriovenous malformations, cavernous hemangiomata. Hemosiderin depositionon on the surface of the brain and spinal cord due to chronic bleeding in the subarachnoid space is known as superficial siderosis.
- Hemosiderin collects in the skin and is slowly removed after bruising; hemosiderin may remain in some conditions such as stasis dermatitis.
- Hemosiderin in the kidneys has been associated with marked hemolysis and a rare blood disorder called paroxysmal nocturnal hemoglobinuria.

Hemosiderin may deposit in diseases associated with iron overload. These diseases are typically diseases in which chronic blood loss requires frequent blood transfusions, such as sickle cell anemia and thalassemia, though beta thalassemia minor has been associated with hemosiderin deposits in the liver in those with non-alcoholic fatty liver disease independent of any transfusions.

Iron overload occurs when iron intake is increased over a sustained period of time due to regular transfusion of whole blood and red cells or because of increased absorption of iron through the gastrointestinal tract (GI).

Both these phenomena occur in thalassaemias, with blood transfusion therapy being the major cause of iron overload in thalassaemia major and increased GI absorption being more important in patients with intermedia thalassaemia who are not frequently transfused.

Each unit of blood contains about 200 mg iron. After 50 units have been transfused, or earlier in children, siderosis develops, with increased pigmentation of skin exposed to light and susceptibility to infection, reduced growth and delayed sexual development and puberty^{(24)}. The recommended red cell transfusion scheme for patients with β-thalassaemia amounts to 116–232 mg iron per kg mass on an annual basis (0.32-0.64 mg/kg/day).

The human body lacks a mechanism to excrete excess iron. Iron accumulation is toxic to many tissues, causing heart failure, cirrhosis, liver cancer, growth retardation and endocrine abnormalities. In the absence of regular iron chelation therapy, the iron loading rates vary. Monitoring of transfusion iron overload is essential for effective and safe iron chelation tailored to the individual's specific needs.

Serum ferritin (SF) measured at least every 3 months (the currently accepted target value is between 500 and 1000 mg/L) should also be evaluated along with the liver iron concentration (LIC) assessed using a validated and standardized MRI technique and myocardial iron as measured by MRI-based methods with specific software T2*.

For monitoring of transfusion iron overload, other organ function and iron-mediated damage, surveillance of the patient for diabetes, hypothyroidism, hypoparathyroidism and hypogonadotropic hypogonadism is recommended.

== Diagnosis ==
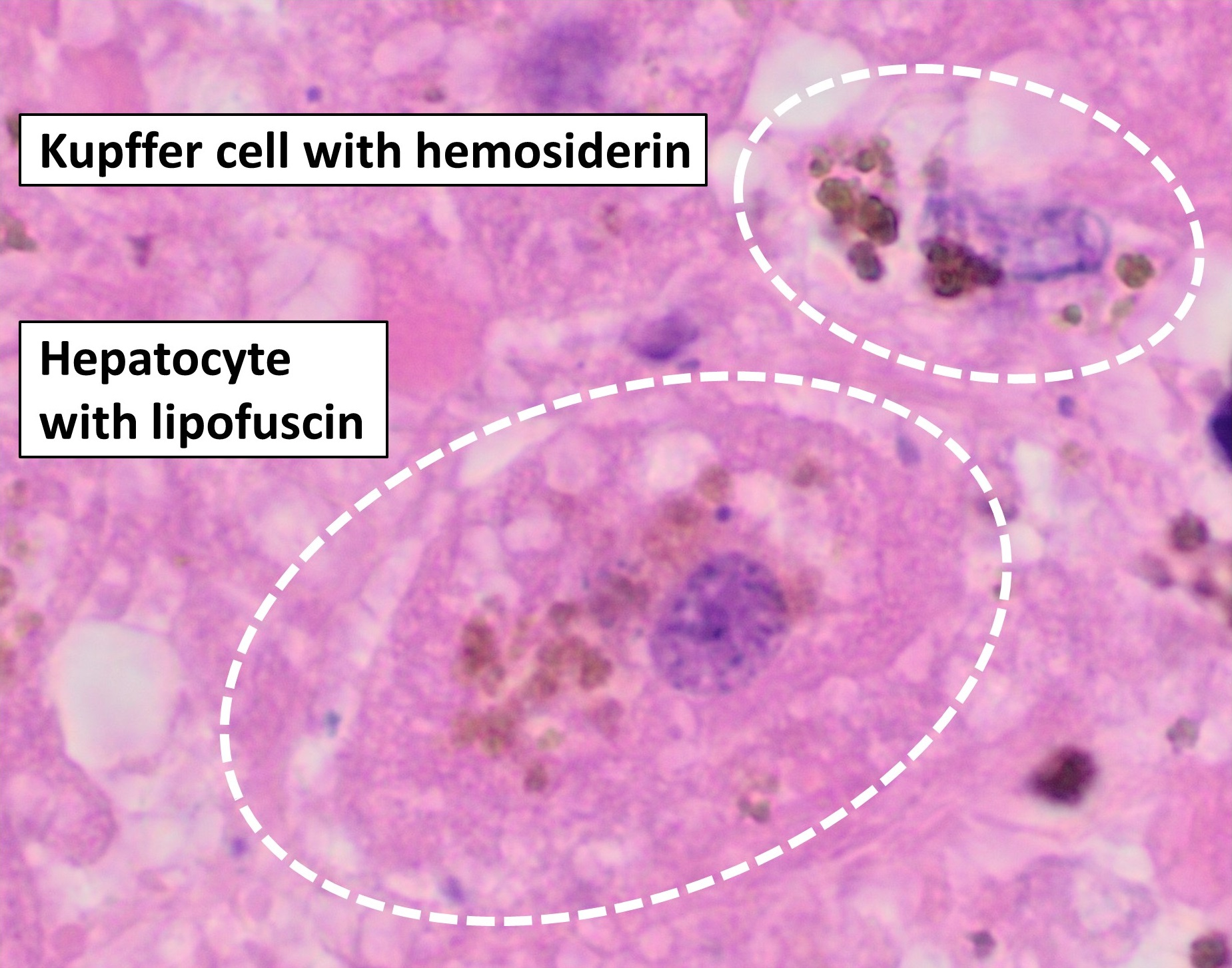
Histopathology of the liver, showing Kupffer cells with significant hemosiderin deposition (shown next to a hepatocyte with lipofuscin pigment, which is a common normal finding). H&E stain.

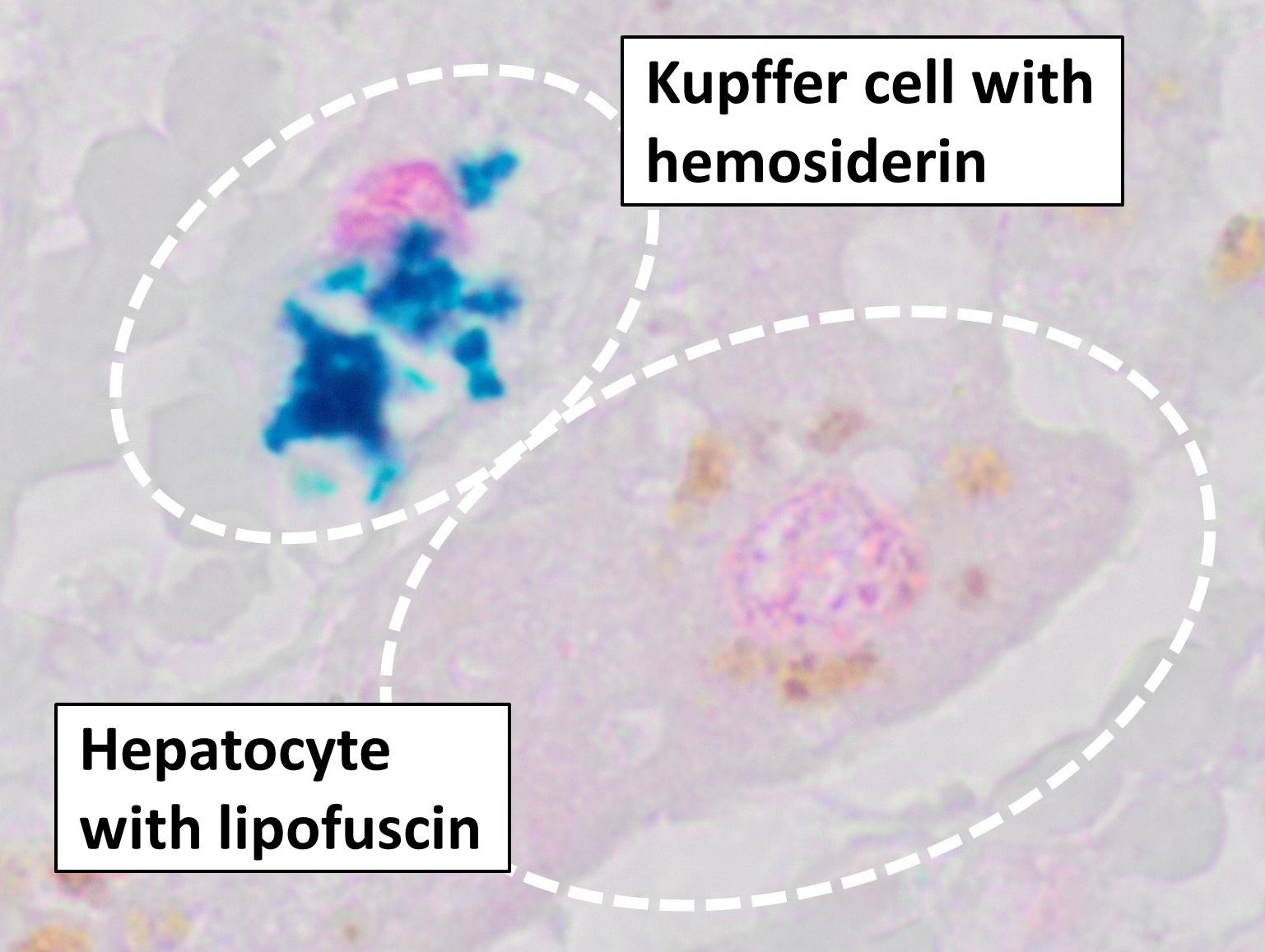
Prussian blue iron staining, highlighting the hemosiderin pigment as blue. This finding indicates mesenchymal iron overload (within Kupffer cells and/or portal macrophages) rather than parenchymal iron overload (within hepatocytes).

There are several methods available for diagnosing and monitoring hemosiderosis including:

- Serum ferritin
- Liver biopsy
- MRI

Serum ferritin is a low cost, readily available, and minimally invasive method for assessing body iron stores. However, the major problem with using it as an indicator of hemosiderosis is that it can be elevated in a range of other medical conditions unrelated to iron levels including infection, inflammation, fever, liver disease, renal disease and cancer.

While liver biopsies provide a direct measure of liver iron concentration, the small sample size relative to the size of the liver can lead to sampling errors given the heterogeneity of iron concentration within the liver. Furthermore, the invasive nature of liver biopsy and the associated risks of complications (which can range from pain, haemorrhage, gallbladder perforation and other morbidities through to death in approximately 1 in 10,000 cases) prevent it being used as a regular monitoring tool.

Magnetic resonance imaging (MRI) is emerging as an alternative method for measuring liver iron loading because it is non-invasive, safer and generally cheaper to perform than liver biopsy; does not suffer from problems with sampling variability; and can be used more frequently than performing liver biopsies.

== Treatment ==
Treatment for hemosiderin focuses on limiting the effects of the underlying disease leading to continued deposition. In hemochromatosis, this entails frequent phlebotomy granulomatosis, immune suppression is required. Limiting blood transfusions and institution of iron chelation therapy when iron overload is detected are important when managing sickle-cell anemia and other chronic hemolytic anemias.

The aims of iron chelation therapy include (a) prevention therapy in order to minimize the risk of onset of iron-mediated complications, (b) rescue therapy for the removal of storage iron and (c) emergency therapy if heart failure develops or if there is a downward trend of left ventricular (LV) function that requires hospitalisation using continuous intravenous desferrioxamine (DFO), possibly combined with deferiprone (DFP). It aims to balance the rate of iron accumulation from blood transfusion by increasing iron excretion in urine and in faeces with chelators.

There are currently three licensed iron chelators, DFO, DFP and Deferasirox (DFX). The Guide for the Management of Transfusion Dependent Thalassaemia (TDT) issued by the Thalassaemia International Federation (TIF Publication No23, 2017) contains details of dose and regimen adjustment of iron chelation therapy, adherence to therapy and use of combination therapies as well as monitoring of chelation therapy in special circumstances such as pregnancy, renal impairment and summary recommendations.

== See also ==
- Brown induration
- Iron overload
- Siderosis
