= Cryofibrinogenemia =

- Specialty: Pathology

Cryofibrinogenemia refers to a condition classified as a fibrinogen disorder in which a person's blood plasma is allowed to cool substantially (i.e. from its normal temperature of 37 °C to the near-freezing temperature of 4 °C), causing the (reversible) precipitation of a complex containing fibrinogen, fibrin, fibronectin, and, occasionally, small amounts of fibrin split products, albumin, immunoglobulins and other plasma proteins.

Return of plasma to more normal temperature resolubilizes the precipitate. Cryofibrinogenemia may occur in individuals that have no obvious evidence of precipitate-induced tissue damage (asymptomatic cryofibrinogenemia), or in consequence of cryofibrinogen precipitation resulting in blood clots in small and medium size arteries and veins.

When occurring in association with another causal disease, cryofibrinogenemic disease is referred as secondary cryofibrinogenemia; in the absence of such an association, it is referred to as primary cryofibrinogenemia.

Purpura seen in cryofibrinogenemia may also be referred to as cryofibrinogenemic purpura.

== Cryofibrinogen precipitation ==
The reasons for the cold temperature-induced in vitro as well as the in vivo precipitation of the fibrinogen-containing complex is unknown. The fibrinogen involved in precipitate formation appears to have a normal structure. This separates cryofibrinogenemia from two pathological blood-clotting/bleeding diseases that can mimic cryofibrinogenemia but are due to structurally abnormal fibrinogen viz., dysfibrinogenemia and hypodysfibrinogenemia. Based on in vitro studies, three causes have been hypothesized for the precipitate formed in cryofibrinogenemia. 1) The blood and plasma of individuals with cryofibrinogenemia lack the fibrinolysis activity that normally degrades and thereby resolubilizes the precipitate. This hypothesis is based on the findings that some but not all individuals with the disorder have abnormally high levels of one or two of the agents, alpha-1 antitrypsin and alpha-2-Macroglobulin, which inhibit the naturally occurring fibrinolytic agent, plasmin. 2) The blood of individuals has an increased ability of the pro-coagulant thrombin to bind fibrinogen and thereby promote coagulation. 3) The blood of individuals, particularly those with cryofibriognemic disease associated with other severe disorders, has high levels of immunological elements such as immunoglobulins or immune complexes that interact with fibronectin to promote blood clotting. This hypothesis is based on findings that some patients with cyrofibrinogenemic disease improve when treated with immunosuppressive drugs. Further basic research into this area is required.

== Asymptomatic cryofibrinogenemia ==
The occurrence of cryofibrinogenemia as defined by a 4 °C-induced formation of fibrinogen-based precipitation in plasma occurs in 2% to 9% of asymptomatic individuals and 8% to 13% of hospitalized patients without symptoms attributable to this precipitation. Most of these cases have relatively low levels of cold temperature-induced fibrinogen precipitate levels (<50 milligram/liter of fibrinogen) and do not have a disorder associated with the development of cryofibrinogenemia.

== Associated disorders ==
Cryoglobulinemia may occur without evidence of an underlying associated disorders, i.e. primary cryoglobulinemia (also termed essential cryoglobulinemia) or, far more commonly, with evidence of an underlying disease, i.e. secondary cryoglobulinemia. Secondary cryofibrinogenemia can develop in individuals with infection (~12% of cases), malignant or premalignant disorders (21%), vasculitis (25%), and autoimmune diseases (42%). In these cases of the secondary disorder, cryofibrinogenemia may or may not cause tissue injury and/or other symptoms and the actual cause-effect relationship between these diseases and the development of cryofibrinogenemia is unclear.

=== Infection-associated cryofibrinogenemia ===
Acute bacterial and mycobacterium infections are sometimes associated with cryofibrinogenemia. In these cases, cryofibrinogenemia is usually transient and rapidly resolves after appropriate anti-bacterial treatment. In HIV/AIDS virus, Epstein–Barr virus, cytomegalovirus, varicella zoster virus, herpes simplex virus, and hepatitis virus infections any rise in circulating cryofibrinogen is more sustained and potentially symptomatic. For example, one large study of the most thoroughly study example of viral infection-associated cryofibrinogenemia, Hepatitis C infection, found that cryofibrinogenemia occurred in 37% of cases, was associated with concurrent cryoglobulinemia in 89% of cases, and led to significantly increased vascular disruption. Antiviral therapy resulted in complete resolution of the cryofibrinogenemia in only ~50% of these cases.

=== Malignancy-associated cryofibrinogenemia ===
Lymphoproliferative disorders such as B-cell lymphomas, T-cell lymphomas, chronic lymphocytic leukemia, and various plasma cell dyscrasias (e.g. multiple myeloma, Waldenström's macroglobulinemia, and the premalignant precursors to these two diseases, MGUS, smoldering multiple myeloma, IgM MGUS, and smoldering Waldenström's macroglobulinemia as well as adenocarcinomas of the stomach, liver, lung, colon, and other solid tumor cancers have been reported to be associated with symptomatic or asymptomatic cryofibrinogenemia.

=== Vasculitis-associated cryofibrinogenemia ===
Cryofibrinogenemia is often associated with inflammatory disease of the arteries and/or veins. These vasculitis-associated diseases include ANCA-associated vasculitides, giant cell arteritis, Behcet disease, polyarteritis nodosa, and Henoch–Schonlein purpura. Cryofibrinogenemia is also often associated with the inflammatory vasculitis that accompanies mixed Cryoglobulinemia#Classification, i.e. cryoglobulinemic vasculitis, particularly but not exclusively in instances where hepatitis C virus is an underlining disease.

=== Autoimmune disease-associated cryofibrinogenemia ===
A broad range of autoimmune diseases have been reported to be associated with cryofibrinogenemia. These diseases include systemic lupus erythematosus, Sjögren syndrome, rheumatoid arthritis, mixed connective tissue disease, polymyositis, dermatomyositis, systemic sclerosis, antiphospholipid antibody syndrome, Hashimoto disease, Graves' disease, sarcoidosis, pyoderma gangrenosum, spondyloarthropathy, Crohn's disease, and ulcerative colitis.

== Cryofibrinogenemic disease ==
=== Symptoms and signs ===
Cryofibrinogenemic disease commonly begins in adults aged 40–50 years old with symptoms of the diseases occurring in the almost always affected organ, skin. Cutaneous symptoms include one or more of the following: cold contact-induced urticarial (which may be the first sign of the disease); painful episodes of finger and/or toe arterial spasms termed Raynaud phenomena; cyanosis, a palpable purpura termed cryofibrinogenemic purpura), and a lace-like purplish discoloration termed livedo reticularis all of which occur primarily in the lower extremities but some of which may occur in the nose, ears, and buttocks; non-healing painful ulcerations and gangrene of the areas impacted by the cited symptoms. Patients also have a history of cold sensitivity (~25% of cases), arthralgia (14–58%), neuritis (7–19%), myalgia (0–14%); and overt thrombosis of arteries and veins (25–40%) which may on rare occasions involve major arteries such of those of the brain and kidney. Signs of renal involvement (proteinuria, hematuria, decreased glomerular filtration rate, and/or, rarely, renal failure) occur in 4 to 25% of cases. Compared to secondary cryofibrinogemia, primary cryofibrinogenemia has a higher incidence of cutaneous lesions, arthralgia, and cold sensitivity while having a far lower incidence of renal involvement. Patients with secondary cryofibrinogenemia also exhibit signs and symptoms specific to the infectious, malignant, premalignant vasculitis, and autoimmune disorders associated with their disease. While rare, individuals with cryofibrinogenemic disease may experience pathological bleeding due to the consumption of blood clotting factors consequential to the formation of cryofibrinogen precipitates.

=== Diagnosis ===
Suggested diagnostic criteria for cryoglobulinemic disease fall into the following obligatory and additional categories:

- Obligatory criteria: 1) cold sensitivity; 2) cutaneous symptoms (i.e. urticaria, purpura, Raynaud phenomenon, ulceration/necrosis/gangrene, and/or livedo reticularis); 3) arterial and/or venous thrombotic events; fever; 4) arthralgia/myalgia; 5) neuritis in >1 site; and 6) renal disorder.
- Additional criteria: 1) typical biopsy findings at site(s) of involvement and 2) angiogram evidence of occlusion in one or more small to medium-sized arteries.

The diagnosis of secondary cryofibrinogenemia also requires evidence for the cited infectious, malignant, premalignant vasculitis, and autoimmune disorders while the diagnosis of primary cryofibrinogenemia requires a lack of evidence for 1) the cited associated disorders, 2) other vascular occlusive diseases, and 3) cryoglobulinemia.

=== Treatment ===
Studies on the treatment of cryofibrinoginemic disease have involved relatively few patients, are limited primarily to case reports, and differ based on whether the disease is primary or secondary. In all cases of cryofibrinogenemic disease, however, patients should avoid the exposure of affected body parts to cold weather or other environmental triggers of symptoms and avoid using cigarettes or other tobacco products. In severe cases, these individuals also risk developing serious thrombotic events which lead to tissue necrosis that may result in secondary bacterial infections and require intensive antimicrobial therapy and/or amputations. Careful treatment of these developments is required.

==== Primary cryofibrinogenemic disease ====
Success in treating the primary disease has been reported using blood clot lysing agents such as anabolic steroids (e.g. danazol or stanozolol which is no longer available in the United States), streptokinase, and streptodornase; anticoagulants such as heparin and warfarin, and immunosuppressive drug regimens such as a corticosteroid (e.g. prednisone) combined with either azathioprine of chlorambucil. Very moderate cases may do well by simply avoiding cold exposure. Treatment with a corticosteroid plus low-dose aspirin followed by maintenance therapy with an anabolic steroid where necessary are recommended for moderately severe cases. Very severe cases generally require an immunosuppressive drug regimen and if extreme or life-threatening require resorting to plasmaphoresis or plasma exchange. Cryofiltration apheresis, a method to remove plasma agents by removing cold-induced precipitated material, may be an effective alternative to plasmaphoresis and plasma exchange but is still regarded as second-line therapy for cryofibirnogenemic disease treatment.

During the several years following its initial diagnosis, some 27 to 47% of primary cryofibrinoginemic diseases are complicated by the development of a B-cell or T-cell lymphoma. That is, the cryofibrinoginemic disease may appear to precede by years the malignant disorder to which it is associated. Accordingly, patients require careful follow-up not only to treat their primary cryofibrinoginemic disease but also to monitor them for movement to the diagnosis of secondary cryofibrinoginemic disease caused by the development of one of these hematological malignancies.

==== Secondary cryofibrinogenemic disease ====
Treatment of secondary cryofibrinoginemic disease may use the same methods used for treating the primary disease wherever necessary but focus on treating the associated infectious, malignant, premalignant, vasculitis, or autoimmune disorder with the methods prescribed for the associated disorder. Case report studies suggest that: corticosteroids and immunosuppressive drug regimens, antimicrobial therapy, and anti-neoplastic regimens can be effective treatments for controlling the cryofibrinogenemic disease in cases associated respectively with autoimmune, infectious, and premalignant/malignant disorders.

=== Prognosis ===
While the prognosis of cryofibrinoginemic disease varies greatly depending on its severity as well as the severity of its associated disorders, satisfactory clinical outcomes are reported in 50 to 80% of patients with primary or secondary disease treated with corticosteroid and/or immunosuppressive regimens. However, relapses occur within the first 6 months after stopping or decreasing therapy in 40 to 76% of cases. Sepsis resulting from infection of necrotic tissue is the most common threat to life in primary disease whereas the associated disorder is a critical determinant of prognosis in secondary disease.

== See also ==
- Cryoglobulinemia
- Dysfibrinogenemia
- Hypodysfibrinogenemia
