= Monoclonal gammopathy =

Excess myeloma protein or monoclonal gamma globulin in the blood

- Other names: paraproteinemia
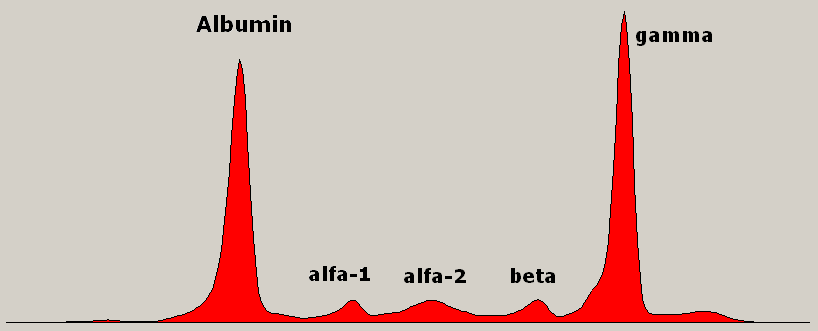
- Serum protein electrophoresis shows gamma spike, or peak
- Specialty: Oncology

Monoclonal gammopathy, also known as paraproteinemia, is the presence of excessive amounts of myeloma protein or monoclonal gamma globulin in the blood. It is usually due to an underlying immunoproliferative disorder or hematologic neoplasms, especially multiple myeloma. It is sometimes considered equivalent to plasma cell dyscrasia. The most common form of the disease is monoclonal gammopathy of undetermined significance.

== Causes ==
Causes of paraproteinemia include the following:

- Leukemias and lymphomas of various types, but usually B-cell non-Hodgkin lymphomas with a plasma cell component.
  - Myeloma
  - Plasmacytoma
  - Lymphoplasmacytic lymphoma
- Idiopathic (no discernible cause): some of these will be revealed as leukemias or lymphomas over the years.
  - AL amyloidosis

== Diagnosis ==
These are characterized by the presence of any abnormal protein that is involved in the immune system, which are most often immunoglobulins and are associated with the clonal proliferation of lymphocytes.

When a paraproteinemia is present in the blood, there will be a narrow band, or spike, in the serum protein electrophoresis because there will be an excess of production of one protein.

There are two large classes of blood proteins: albumin and globulin. They are generally equal in proportion, but albumin is much smaller than globulin, and slightly negatively charged, which leads to an accumulation at the end of the electrophoretic gel. The globulins separate out into three regions on the electrophoretic gel, which are the α band, the β band, and the γ band.

- The α band can be separated into two components: α1 and α2. The α1 region consists mostly of α1-antitrypsin and α1-acid glycoprotein. The α2 region is mostly haptoglobin, α2-macroglobulin, α2-antiplasmin, and ceruloplasmin.
- The β band consists of transferrin, low-density lipoproteins, and complement system proteins.
- The γ band is where the immunoglobulins appear, which is why they are also known as gammaglobulins. The majority of paraproteins appear in this band.

=== Types ===
Paraproteinemias may be categorized according to the type of monoclonal protein found in blood:

- Light chains only (or Bence Jones protein). This may be associated with multiple myeloma or AL amyloidosis.
- Heavy chains only (also known as "heavy chain disease");
- Whole immunoglobulins. If immunoglobulins tend to precipitate within blood vessels with cold, that phenomenon takes the name of cryoglobulinaemia.

The three types of paraproteins may occur alone or in combination in a given individual. Note that while most heavy chains or whole immunoglobulins remain within blood vessels, light chains frequently escape and are excreted by the kidneys into urine, where they take the name of Bence Jones protein.

It is also possible for paraproteins (usually whole immunoglobulins) to form polymers by aggregating with each other; this takes the name of macroglobulinemia and may lead to further complications. For example, certain macroglobulins tend to precipitate within blood vessel with cold, a phenomenon known as cryoglobulinemia. Others may make blood too viscous to flow smoothly (usually with IgM pentamer macroglobulins), a phenomenon known as Waldenström macroglobulinemia.

The most common type of paraproteinemia is monoclonal gammopathy of undetermined significance (MGUS). Another form, monoclonal gammopathy of renal significance (MGRS) results in kidney damage and chronic kidney disease due to the effects of monoclonal immunoglobulins.
