= Bing–Neel syndrome =

- Specialty: Neurology

Bing–Neel syndrome (BNS) is an extremely rare neurologic complication of Waldenström macroglobulinemia (WM), which is a chronic lymphoproliferative disorder. There's no clear definition of BNS but what is known so far is that unlike WM, It involves the central nervous system (CNS), infiltrated by differentiated malignant B cells and by having hyperglobulinemia. This infiltration increases blood viscosity, which impairs blood circulation through small blood vessels of the brain and the eye. Some scientists proposed that a person diagnosed with BNS is typically classified into Group A and Group B depending on whether or not plasma cells are present within the brain parenchyma, leptomeninges, dura, and/or the cerebral spinal fluid (CSF). Symptoms are diverse and nonspecific, and they can vary depending on which aspect of the CNS is being affected. Symptoms can include a range of severity of nausea and seizures. Since the symptoms vary, there are multiple treatment options to treat the symptoms for this non-curable disease. Although there is no specific set of diagnosis for BNS, different combinations of diagnostic tools are used to narrow down and conclude the presence of BNS.

== Symptoms and signs ==
Symptoms of BNS gradually progress over the span of a week or even a month, and there is typically a delay in diagnosis after the initial symptoms arise. Although BNS arises due to complications from WM, some individuals may experience symptoms of BNS without having a history of WM.

Given that BNS is so rare, the symptoms are diverse and nonspecific. Symptoms range in severity from nausea to seizures and are characterized by how they interfere with the function of the CNS. Where certain symptoms are present depends on which branch of the CNS is being affected by plasma B-cells. People diagnosed with BNS experience some sensory symptoms as well. Some sensory symptoms include a pin and needles sensation experienced in the lower limbs, the hands, and in the arms, along with pain and extreme numbness.

Symptoms Common to BNS
Symptom	Example
Nausea	Not Specific
Seizures	Interference in CNS function
Vomiting	Not Specific
Visual Disturbance	Not Specific
Hearing Loss	Not Specific
Cranial neuropathies	Predominantly in Oculomotor nerve
Meningeal Involvement	Usually accompanied by cranial neuropathies
Cognitive Decline	Memory loss; Periods of Confusion
aphasia	Loss of language function: Slurred speech; inability to form words
psychosis	Inference in CNS function
Cerebellar dysfunction	Uncontrollable movement; Loss of Balance
Impaired Consciousness	Coma
Headache	Not specific
Fatigue	Not Specific
paresis	Muscle weakness

== Diagnosis ==
There is no clear-cut route to diagnosing BNS, meaning just one diagnostic tool alone is not conclusive in diagnosing BNS. But through the utilization of several different tools cooperatively, a diagnosis can be reached through the elimination of other CNS pathologies.

=== Histology ===
Infiltration of malignant, differentiated B-cells linked to WM into the nervous system precipitates BNS. Histological practices that entail a biopsy of the cerebrum and/or the meninges look for the presence of lymphoplasmacytic lymphomas (Mature B-cells). Though a biopsy alone is not indicative of BNS, it is a necessary step that ensures that at the very least, the CNS has been infiltrated by some sort of lymphoma.

=== Cerebrospinal fluid analysis ===
Analysis entails analyzing several different aspects of the cerebrospinal fluid (CSF) to identify characteristics linked to WM and BNS. Quantification of leukocytes and their differentiation, as well as a morphological analysis of any detected malignant lymphomas found in the CSF are some parameters assed by CSF analysis.Flow cytometry, used to identify cell biomarkers, is an auxiliary tool used in CSF analysis. With respect to diagnosing BNS, flow cytometry analyzes CSF contents for B-cells expressing the pan antigens CD19 and CD20, commonly found in WM; not all cases of BNS show conclusive findings in CSF analysis.

=== Radiology ===
MRI with gadolinium contrast is the primary radiologic tool used to diagnose ailments of the central nervous system, BNS included. MRI's effect is twofold in that it is able to identify brain and spine abnormalities, as well as identifying tissues appropriate for biopsy. MRI with gadolinium contrast can also discern which form of BNS has formed. Where the tumoral form of BNS is highlighted by tumor growth in the subcortical hemispheric regions, the diffuse form of BNS is characterized by leptomeningeal and perivascular infiltration by lymphoid cells. Other characteristics of BNS identified via MRI are abnormal enhancement of cranial and spinal nerves, as well as thickening and enhancement of the cauda equina.

=== Sequence analysis ===
The MYD88 L265P is a gene mutation found in the majority of WM cases. During CSF analysis, PCR amplification of genomic DNA found in the fluid, followed by sequencing, can determine if the mutation is present within the CNS; if so, this would be indicative of, though not conclusive, of BNS.

== Treatment ==
Treatment for BNS has a multitude of options. If people with BNS are asymptomatic, physicians will watch for progression of the disease using MRI. If any signs of further disease is shown, they will take action to alleviate the symptoms. Because this disease is non-curative and rather rare, treatment is only used to get rid of symptoms. Even so, due to the lack of regeneration of the nervous system, some symptoms may not be reversible and stay with the person with BNS. There are some costs, along with the benefits, of treating the symptoms depending on the type, which may include lesions or brain damage. Doctors will make a risk assessment and monitor by MRI to validate that complications do not occur.

There are a few options when it comes to treatment so the type one will choose is completely individualized, taking into consideration the person's state or condition and liking.

=== Steroids ===
Steroids are mostly used for short term and quick use. The use provides improvement, but should not be considered a long-term plan. Physicians would normally prescribe steroids after a biopsy and after further analysis has been completed.

=== Chemotherapy ===
Treatment also involves central nervous system penetrating chemotherapy. Options include intrathecal, intraventricular, and systemic chemotherapy. These must penetrate the blood-brain barrier in order to be effective. Sometimes mixing multiple forms of treatment with chemotherapy seems to be the best route. For example, some significant improvement has been shown as a result of cranial radiation treatment preceding a brief course of intrathecal chemotherapy. Although this is an effective treatment to do, penetrating the blood-brain barrier can cause side effects due to the toxicity in the nervous system. These would include dizziness, confusion, and changes in mental status. Another form could be the use of pharmaceuticals, which have all shown positive results for treatment but should always be consulted with a physician to assess risks. Bruton's Tyrosine Kinase Inhibitors are very active in Bing Neel Syndrome and have largely become the standard for frontline treatment of this manifestation of Waldenstrom's Macroglobulinemia. In a study of 28 patients, the BTK-inhibitor ibrutinib was administered orally. At best response, 85% of patients had improvement or resolution of BNS symptoms, 83% had improvement or resolution of radiologic abnormalities, and 47% had cleared the disease in the cerebrospinal fluid. The 2-year event-free survival rate with ibrutinib was 80%, and the 5-year BNS survival rate was 86%.

In a retrospective study, Vos et al studied the outcome of 15 WM patients with Bing-Neel Syndrome who received zanubrutinib. In 86.7% of cases, BNS was identified in previously diagnosed LPL and in 2 as new-onset LPL. Ten patients were previously treated for LPL at time of BNS diagnosis. Eight patients had previously received treatment for BNS, including chemo-immunotherapy and ibrutinib. Cytologic assessment and/or flow cytometry of CSF was positive for clonal B cells in 10/13 patients tested. Molecular analysis of CSF was positive for MYD88L265P in all cases at BNS diagnosis and/or start of zanubrutinib. Median follow-up time was 7.7 months, all patients were alive and still on zanubrutinib treatment. Of 12 patients with neurological symptoms at baseline, 11 experienced clinical improvement with complete resolution of symptoms in 5 patients. Out of 5 patients with repeated CSF analysis, 3 demonstrated persistent detectable clonal LPL cells. Of 12 patients with MRI abnormalities, 6 had radiological improvement, with repeated MRI not yet performed in the other 6. No relapses occurred.

=== Stem-Cells ===
Autologous stem-cell transplants are shown to be an effective treatment. However, this should be only considered for certain people due to toxicity concerns. It is possible that the transplant may cause problems like septic shock.

=== Radiation ===
Lastly, radiation is normally used as a rescue type treatment and is not recommended as a first line treatment. The doctor would perform localized radiation therapy at a dose of 30 to 40 Gy on the lesions. This is to limit the amount of radiation and prevent further damage to the nervous system, which could happen due to the toxicity of radiation therapy.

== History ==
Bing–Neel syndrome was first described by Jens Bing and Axel Valdemar Neel, who observed a case of 2 women, 56 and 39 years old, presenting with rapid neurodegeneration in the setting of hyperglobulinemia. This discovery was reported eight years before the first report on WM, which was discovered and described by Jan Waldenström. From the first publication, there was never a clear consensus and guideline to the diagnosis and treatment of BNS. It was only 80 years later that there was a meeting with a group of people at the 8th International Workshop on WM to come up with broad diagnostic criteria for BNS. This group of people included radiologists, immunologists, hematologists, and neurologists from all over the world using PubMed as their source for the guideline. The first draft was reviewed by a multidisciplinary team of experts in WM.
