= Meltzer's triad =

- Differential diagnosis: cryoglobulinaemia

Meltzer's triad describes the classical symptoms suggesting the diagnosis of cryoglobulinaemia of polyclonal cryoglobulins seen in essential, viral, or connective tissue disease associated cryoglobulinaemia. The triad consists of:

- palpable purpura
- arthralgia (joint pain)
- weakness.

In cryoglobulinemia, immunoglobulins and sometimes complement components precipitate from the bloodsteam at temperatures less than 37 degrees Celsius. These immunoglobulins deposit in the walls of blood vessels and organs causing inflammation of blood vessels (vasculitis) and organ damage.

The clinical triad was first described in 1966 by Meltzer and colleagues in a case series of 29 people with cryoglobulinema. Although the triad of clinical symptoms is characteristic of the disease, all three signs appear in a minority of patients.
