= Congenital hemolytic anemia =

- Other names: Hereditary hemolytic anemia
- Specialty: Hematology
- Symptoms: Anemia
- Types: Hereditary spherocytosis, Hereditary elliptocytosis, Glucose-6-phosphate dehydrogenase deficiency, Pyruvate kinase deficiency, Aldolase A deficiency, Sickle cell anemia, Congenital dyserythropoietic anemia, Thalassemia
- Causes: A group of inherited diseases
- Diagnostic method: Blood tests, genetic testing

Congenital hemolytic anemia is a diverse group of hereditary conditions marked by premature removal of red blood cells from circulation (hemolysis), often leading to severe anemia and decreased life expectancy. This may be caused by defects in the red cell's membrane proteins, internal metabolism, or by defective or deficient hemoglobin.

== Subtypes ==
=== Hereditary spherocytosis ===
Hereditary spherocytosis is a common hemolytic disorder distinguished by a defect or deficiency within one or more of the proteins that make up the membrane of the red blood cell. As a result of this, red blood cells have an abnormal shape, require more metabolic energy, and are trapped and destroyed prematurely in the spleen. With a prevalence of about 1 in 2000, hereditary spherocytosis, including the very mild or subclinical forms, is the most prevalent cause of non-immune hemolytic anemia in people of Northern European ancestry. However, very mild varieties of the disease are likely to be far more common. In 75% of cases, hereditary spherocytosis is inherited as a dominant trait, with the remainder being truly recessive cases as well as de novo mutations. The hallmark of HS is chronic hemolysis. Most people have a mild condition that does not require any treatment. In extreme situations, it causes jaundice, splenomegaly, and severe anemia. Folate supplementation is advised in cases of severe and moderate HS but is not required in cases of mild HS. In severe cases, splenectomy may be advised as a therapy and may help to improve the condition.

=== Hereditary elliptocytosis ===
Hereditary elliptocytosis is a group of red blood cell membrane disorders characterized by elliptical erythrocytes and decreased RBC survival. Defects in the cytoskeletal proteins that keep red blood cells in their biconcave shape can cause hereditary elliptocytosis. These defects can be either in quantity or structure. Since most patients have compensated hemolysis even in the presence of hemolysis, symptoms are generally uncommon. Patients with significant clinical hemolysis, on the other hand, may experience anemia-related symptoms. Hereditary elliptocytosis is diagnosed by identifying abnormal red blood cell morphology on a peripheral blood smear and identifying characteristic membrane biomechanical properties with osmotic gradient ektacytometry. Hereditary elliptocytosis (HE) rarely causes symptoms and requires no treatment. Splenectomy significantly improves the condition of patients with clinically significant hemolytic anemia.

=== Glucose-6-phosphate dehydrogenase deficiency ===
Glucose-6-phosphate dehydrogenase deficiency is the most common enzyme deficiency worldwide, is an inborn error of metabolism that predisposes to red blood cell breakdown. Most of the time, those who are affected have no symptoms. Following a specific trigger, symptoms such as yellowish skin, dark urine, shortness of breath, and feeling tired may develop. Complications can include anemia and newborn jaundice. The most important measure is prevention – avoidance of the drugs and foods that cause hemolysis. Vaccination against some common pathogens (e.g. hepatitis A and hepatitis B) may prevent infection-induced attacks.

=== Pyruvate kinase deficiency ===
Pyruvate kinase deficiency is an inherited metabolic disorder of the enzyme pyruvate kinase which affects the survival of red blood cells. Both autosomal dominant and recessive inheritance have been observed with the disorder; classically, and more commonly, the inheritance is autosomal recessive. Pyruvate kinase deficiency is the second most common cause of enzyme-deficient hemolytic anemia, following G6PD deficiency. The symptoms of pyruvate kinase deficiency are mild to severe hemolytic Anemia, cholecystolithiasis, tachycardia, hemochromatosis, icteric sclera, splenomegaly, leg ulcers, jaundice, fatigue, and shortness of breath. The diagnosis of pyruvate kinase deficiency can be done by full blood counts (differential blood counts) and reticulocyte counts. The most common treatment is blood transfusions, especially in infants and young children. This is done if the red blood cell count has fallen to a critical level.

=== Aldolase A deficiency ===
Aldolase A deficiency is an autosomal recessive metabolic disorder resulting in a deficiency of the enzyme aldolase A; the enzyme is found predominantly in red blood cells and muscle tissue. The deficiency may lead to hemolytic anaemia as well as myopathy associated with exercise intolerance and rhabdomyolysis in some cases.

=== Sickle cell anemia ===
The underlying cause of sickle cell anemia is a mutation of the beta-hemoglobin gene which results in an abnormal hemoglobin. Under conditions of low oxygen, dehydration, or stress the abnormal hemoglobin can polymerise: this distorts the shape of the red blood cell to form a characteristic sickle shape. Sickle cell anemia symptoms usually appear around the age of six months. They can change over time and differ from person to person. A few indications and symptoms include anemia, sporadic episodes of excruciating pain, hand and foot edema, recurrent infections, delayed puberty or growth, and visual issues. The goal of sickle cell anemia treatment is usually to avoid pain episodes, relieve symptoms, and prevent complications. Treatment may include infection prevention with vaccination and antibiotics, high fluid intake, folic acid supplementation, and pain medication. Other measures may include blood transfusion and the medication hydroxycarbamide (hydroxyurea). In 2023, new gene therapies were approved involving the genetic modification and replacement of blood forming stem cells in the bone marrow.

=== Congenital dyserythropoietic anemia ===
Congenital dyserythropoietic anemia (CDA) is a rare blood disorder, similar to the thalassemias. CDA is one of many types of anemia, characterized by ineffective erythropoiesis, and resulting from a decrease in the number of red blood cells (RBCs) in the body and a less than normal quantity of hemoglobin in the blood. The symptoms and signs of congenital dyserythropoietic anemia are consistent fatigue, weakness, and pale skin. The diagnosis of congenital dyserythropoietic anemia can be done via sequence analysis of the entire coding region, types I, II, III and IV. Treatment of individuals with CDA usually consist of frequent blood transfusions, but this can vary depending on the type that the individual has.

=== Thalassemia ===
Thalassemia is a group of inherited anemias in which hemoglobin synthesis is reduced from normal levels, or sometimes zero. Symptoms depend on the extent to which hemoglobin production is affected, and can vary from none to severe. Often there is mild to severe anemia (low red blood cells or hemoglobin) as thalassemia can affect the production of red blood cells and also affect how long the red blood cells live. Symptoms of anemia include feeling tired and having pale skin. Other symptoms of thalassemia include bone problems, an enlarged spleen, yellowish skin, pulmonary hypertension, and dark urine. Slow growth may occur in children. Treatment depends on the type and severity. Treatment for those with more severe disease often includes regular blood transfusions, iron chelation, and folic acid. Gene therapy or a bone marrow transplant are options for severe cases.

== See also ==
- Hematopoietic ulcer
- List of circulatory system conditions
