= Macroglobulin =

High molecular weight plasma globulin

IgM, pictured, is an example of a macroglobulin. Another example is alpha-2 macroglobulin.

Macroglobulins are large globular proteins and are found in the blood and other body fluids. Various physiological processes, including immunity, coagulation, and chemical transport, rely on these proteins. A macroglobulin is a plasma globulin of high molecular weight. Elevated levels of macroglobulins (macroglobulinemia) may cause manifestations of excess blood viscosity (as is the case for IgM antibodies in Waldenström macroglobulinemia) and/or precipitate within blood vessels when temperature drops (as in cryoglobulinaemia). Other macroglobulins include α_{2}-macroglobulin, which is elevated in nephrotic syndrome, diabetes, severe burns, and other conditions, while a deficiency is associated with chronic obstructive pulmonary disease.

== Structure ==
Macroglobulins range in molecular weight from 400,000 to 720,000 daltons. They are made up of four distinguishing subunits that each possess multiple domains. Disulfide bonds and non-covalent interactions allow the subunits to stay together. One zinc atom also occupies a position in each subunit, aiding to maintain the stability of tetramers. The macroglobulin tetramers can be irreversibly dissociated into dimers by metalscontraions as well as chaotropic substances like urea and guanidine hydrochloride. Despite being similar in structure to immunoglobulins (Ig), macroglobulins have a distinct Y-shaped conformation. A sequence of 16 amino acids at the C-terminus of each subunit provides a highly polar, hydrophobic, binding site that can bind any sterically accessible molecule.

== Types of Macroglobulins but With an Emphasis on alpha-2 Macroglobulin ==
There’s four primary main types of macroglobulins, alpha-2 macroglobulin, beta-2 macroglobulin, pregnancy-associated plasma protein-A, and complement component C4-binding protein. Alpha-2 macroglobulin is studied the most. Alpha-2 macroglobulin is a notable plasma component with a molecular mass of 820 kDa, about 300 mg/100 ml, and around 10% carbohydrate in 31 glycans. Alpha-2 macroglobulin is a tetrameric protein which means, in essence, that it is predominantly made up of four identical subunits. Alpha-2 macroglobulin's identical subunits contain 1451 amino acid residues. Each subunit has several domains, of which include a bait region that can engage with different surface receptors on cells and proteases, and a receptor-binding domain. Alpha-2 macroglobulin is important in regulating protease activity in the blood. There are no known full oligosaccharide structures. Alpha-2 macroglobulin is also the largest non-immunoglobulin molecule found among the several highly abundant proteins in peripheral blood circulation.

. Endothelial cells and hepatocytes interact with each other in order to produce alpha-2 macroglobulin where it resides mostly in the liver. A wide range of serine, threonine, pro-inflammatory cytokines, and metalloproteases can be inhibited by alpha-2 macroglobulin. Additionally, it can activate a number of genes necessary for cell oncogenesis, atherosclerosis, and proliferation/hypertrophy.

== alpha-2 Macroglobulin's Function ==
In the plasma and tissues of vertebrates, alpha 2-macroglobulin and similar proteins act as humoral defensive barriers against pathogens by binding onto host or foreign peptides and particles. Human alpha-2 macroglobulin can facilitate the reverse or irreversible capture of proteins with a multitude of biological activities via reactive sites generated by activated molecules, such as transglutaminase cross-linking sites, thioester, and high-affinity zinc sites. The fact that alpha-2 macroglobulin interacts with and engulfs nearly any proteinase it comes across, whether it is native or foreign, suggests that it has a been designated a special role as a "panproteinase inhibitor." De novo binding sites are then created by the activation of alpha-2 macroglobulin and are used to facilitate and organize the establishment of complexes with cytokines and other peptides. The direct physical interrelation of cytokines with activated alpha-2 macroglobulin in cell cultures suggested that it has a function as a biological response modulator.

== Evolutionary History ==
The earliest known members of the macroglobulin family of proteins initially emerged roughly 500–700 million years ago. Presently, members of the macroglobulin family have been identified in crustaceans, molluscs, fish, amphibians, reptiles, ticks, insects, birds, and mammals. The blood of some species show that multiple members of the macroglobulin family have different molecular weights and partially redundant functions. Today, macroglobulin can be found as monomers, dimers, or tetramers in a large range of different species. Each and every protein component can be characterized by having a "trap" which is composed of a cyclic thioether on the bottom and a sizable hydrophobic region. Each representation can administer a variety of regulatory tasks since complexes can be built with various regulatory chemicals via covalent or hydrophobic interactions.The macroglobulin family of proteins can be referred to as the primary regulating macromolecules of organism fluid media because of their lengthy evolutionary history, broad distribution, inherent preservation, and variety of regulatory roles. Mammals have the greatest growth of the alpha-2 macroglobulin family. There is a study of rats that is particularly interesting because the alpha-2 macroglobulin that predominates in rats differs from human alpha-2 macroglobulin by having an extra sulfide bond within the subunit; as a result, it is actually made up of eight subunits. Two macroglobulins with identical qualities first occur in fish whose alpha-2 macroglobulin are represented by tetramer forms, one of which is exclusively found in blood and the other only in eggs. This can be explained by the divergence of the gene's ancestor and the direct linkage of the egg alpha-2 macroglobulin gene to the reproductive process, which necessitates the mobilization of proliferative components. It should be emphasized that complement system proteins first appeared in fish and are structurally and functionally identical to related human proteins.

== Waldenström Macroglobulinemia ==
Waldenström macroglobulinemia is a slow-silent disease that typically develops when a person is around 65 or older, is male, has a family history of lymphoma, and is caucasian. The condition is called Waldenström macroglobulinemia because the abnormal cells generate excessive levels of IgM which is the biggest immunoglobulin protein, and is also one of the causes of the condition. Interestingly, some affected people will exhibit these elevated IgM and lymphoplasmacytic cell levels but display no symptoms of the disease; in these people, the illness is typically discovered by fluke after a blood test that was performed for an entirely different medical reason. Smoldering Waldenström macroglobulinemia is the diagnosis for these people who present asymptomatic to it. Before a person with the illness exhibits observable signs and symptoms, it can take many years. Waldenström macroglobulinemia is an uncommon cancer of the blood cells that is distinguished by the proliferation of abnormal white blood cells within the bone marrow. These aberrant cells resemble both B cells, which are white blood cells, also known as lymphocytes, and plasma cells, which are B cells that went through a secondary type of development. The term "lymphoplasmacytic cells" refers to these irregular cells that display both lymphocyte and plasma-like features. Waldenström macroglobulinemia is categorized as a lymphoplasmacytic lymphoma as a result of these cells.
