= Macroglobulinemia =

- Specialty: Hematology

Macroglobulinemia is the presence of increased levels of macroglobulins in the circulating blood. It is a plasma cell dyscrasia, resembling leukemia, with cells of lymphocytic, plasmacytic, or intermediate morphology, which secrete a monoclonal immunoglobulin M component. There is diffuse infiltration by the malignant cells of the bone marrow and also, in many cases, of the spleen, liver, or lymph nodes. The circulating macroglobulin can produce symptoms of hyperviscosity syndrome: weakness, fatigue, bleeding disorders, and visual disturbances. Peak incidence of macroglobulinemia is in the sixth and seventh decades of life. (Dorland, 28th ed)

== See also ==
- Waldenström macroglobulinemia
- Hematopoietic ulcer
