= Hematopoietic ulcer =

- Specialty: Dermatology

Hematopoietic ulcers are those occurring with sickle cell anemia, congenital hemolytic anemia, polycythemia vera, thrombocytopenic purpura, macroglobulinemia, and cryoglobulinemia.

== See also ==
- Skin lesion
