= Chapel Hill Consensus Conference =

Conference on systemic vasculitides

The Chapel Hill Consensus Conferences (CHCC) (1994 and 2012) are a pair of international conferences which addressed the need of standardized classification system for systemic vasculitides.

== 2012 Revised International Chapel Hill Consensus Conference Nomenclature of Vasculitides ==
Classification Group	Diseases
Large-vessel vasculitis (LVV)	Takayasu's arteritis (TAK); Giant-cell arteritis (GCA)
Medium-vessel vasculitis (MVV)	Polyarteritis nodosa (PAN), Kawasaki disease (KD)
Small vessel vasculitis (SVV)	ANCA-associated vasculitis (AAV); Immune complex SVV
Variable vessel vasculitis (VVV)	Behcet's disease (BD); Cogan's syndrome (CS)
Single Organ Vasculitis (SOV)	Cutaneous leukocytoclastic angiitis; cutaneous arteritis; primary central nervous system vasculitis; isolated aortitis; others
Vasculitis associated with systemic disease	Lupus vasculitis; Rheumatoid vasculitis; Sarcoid vasculitis; others
Vasculitis associated with probable etiology	Hepatitis C virus-associated cryoglobulinemic vasculitis; Hepatitis B virus-associated vasculitis; Syphilis-associated aortitis; Drug-associated immune complex vasculitis; Cancer-associated vasculitis; others
