= Hepatitis C and HIV coinfection =

Human immunodeficiency virus (HIV) and hepatitis C virus (HCV) co-infection is a multi-faceted, chronic condition that significantly impacts public health. According to the World Health Organization (WHO), 2 to 15% of those infected with HIV are also affected by HCV, increasing their risk of morbidity and mortality due to accelerated liver disease. The burden of co-infection is especially high in certain high-risk groups, such as intravenous drug users and men who have sex with men. These individuals who are HIV-positive are commonly co-infected with HCV due to shared routes of transmission including, but not limited to, exposure to HIV-positive blood, sexual intercourse, and passage of the Hepatitis C virus from mother to infant during childbirth.

Infection with HCV can be asymptomatic, resolve itself without treatment, or can lead to cirrhosis or cancer.

== Signs and symptoms ==
Although symptoms of HIV and HCV mono-infection have been well-studied over the years, the symptoms associated with HIV and HCV co-infection remain a developing field of research. Many co-infected individuals report a difficulty in attributing their symptoms to a particular viral infection, indicating an overlap in symptoms of both diseases. This suggests that interventions aiming to reduce the disease burden associated with HIV and HCV co-infection must consist of strategies to manage symptoms of each individual infection.

In contrast to HIV and HCV co-infection, there has been significant research delineating the signs and symptoms of each of these individual illnesses. Common symptoms experienced by HIV-infected individuals include fever, night sweats, diarrhea, nausea, headache, and fatigue. On the other hand, symptoms associated with HCV infection include fatigue, depression, urticaria, peripheral neuropathy, joint pain, and irritability. Co-infected individuals can experience a range of these symptoms, with some studies showing fatigue to be the most prevalent symptom.

== Risk factors ==
Due to the similar routes of transmission of HIV and HCV, HIV-positive individuals are at great risk of HIV and HCV co-infection. These routes of transmission include percutaneous blood exposure, sexual intercourse, and mother-to-child transmission. In the United States, injection drug use is known to be the most common mode of transmission of HCV. Some studies have shown that co-infection is significantly associated with older age as well as illicit intravenous and non-intravenous drug use, and HIV-infected individuals have a higher overall risk of HCV infection irrespective of intravenous drug use or other risk factors.

== Mechanism ==
=== HIV ===
HIV is contracted by coming in contact with the bodily fluids of someone HIV positive. These fluids include blood, semen, pre-seminal fluid, rectal fluids, vaginal fluids, and breast milk. An individual can become infected with HIV if these fluids enter the bloodstream by way of a mucous membrane, damaged tissue or injection. Common HIV routes of transmission include sharing needles, having unprotected sex with someone who is HIV positive, mother to fetus during pregnancy, being stuck with an HIV-contaminated sharp object, etc. Once the virus has entered the blood stream, it attaches to and enters T helper cells (CD4 cells) in order to replicate. After reverse transcription, the new viral DNA integrates itself into the host cell's DNA and instructs the cell to produce viral proteins. These viral proteins bud off of the host CD4 cell and move on to infect other CD4 cells which is how the virus spreads in the body and destroys the immune system.

=== HCV ===
HCV is transmitted by coming in contact with the blood of someone infected with HCV. The virus is commonly spread by sharing needles, mother to infant during birth, improperly sterilized medical equipment, intercourse with an infected individual, and unregulated tattoos. Once inside the body, the virus enters the liver's hepatocyte cells via receptor-mediated endocytosis. Inside the cell, the viral RNA undergoes translation and at the end of the whole process, viral proteins are created. These proteins fuse with lipid droplets in the cytosol of the hepatocyte to form a cell known as a high-density HCV precursor. In the golgi apparatus, the HCV precursor cell fuses with two more cells before becoming the HCV lipoviral particle. HCV in this particle form is protected from antibody neutralization which would normally stop the virus from spreading. These lipoviral particles are released out of the hepatocyte to find other hepatocytes to infect.

=== HIV/HCV ===
Since the two viruses can be spread in similar ways, it is possible for cotransmission to occur where an individual gets infected with both viruses at the same time. People who are coinfected with HIV and HCV by way of blood contact are more likely to be infected with HCV before HIV. Studies have shown that in comparison to HIV, there is up to a 10 fold greater risk of transmitting HCV after contact with an infected needle.

== Diagnosis ==
=== HIV ===
To diagnose an individual with HIV, a test must be taken to determine if the virus is present in their system. There are several test options including ELISA, at-home, saliva, viral load, and western blot. To establish the presence of the HIV virus, some tests measure the level of HIV antibodies in the blood and/or saliva or the level of both HIV antigens and antibodies in the blood. Other tests can detect the presence of the HIV virus by calculating the amount of actual virus present in the blood. None of the tests available can determine if a person is positive immediately after they believe they have been exposed to the virus. Each test has a window of time after the initial exposure occurred until the test can accurately tell if an individual has been infected or not. One reason for this is because the focus of some of the tests are antibodies. After the initial exposure to the virus, it usually takes 3–4 weeks but it can take up to six months for antibodies to be produced by the body. For nucleic acid tests, like the viral load blood test, it can take anywhere from 10–33 days for the test to provide an accurate result. If an individual's first HIV test is positive, it is recommended for them to take a second test to confirm the results. If this follow-up test is also positive, an HIV positive diagnosis can likely be made.

=== HCV ===
For an individual to be diagnosed with HCV, they must first take the hepatitis C antibody (HCV Ab) screening test. This test is used to determine the presence of HCV antibodies in the blood. It can take anywhere from 3–12 weeks after the time of initial exposure for antibodies to appear in the blood. Therefore, even if a person is infected with HCV, an HCV Ab test may not show a positive result until after that amount of time has passed. If the HCV Ab test result is positive for HCV antibodies, then the individual either has an active HCV infection or previously had an infection which has since cleared. The individual must follow-up with a quantitative and/or qualitative HCV RNA blood test which provides a count of the HCV viral load and indicates if the infection is chronic or not. The virus RNA can be detected in the blood 1–2 weeks after exposure. For a quantitative test, a low viral load is any value below <800,000 IU/L and anything above 800,000 IU/L is considered a high viral load. Lower viral loads at the start of treatment have been associated with greater likelihood to clear the infection. A positive result for a qualitative HCV RNA blood test confirms that the active virus is present in the individual's bloodstream and that the infection is chronic. A negative result can indicate that the person's immune system was able to spontaneously clear their body of the infection without treatment. Lastly, there is an HCV genotype test which is done to identify the particular genotype (or strain) of the HCV virus the individual is infected with. There are a total of six different HCV genotypes. Knowing the specific genotype of the virus is important when deciding on treatment options because some antiviral medications are more effective against certain genotypes.

== Treatment ==
Persons living with an HCV–HIV co-infection are at higher risk for certain adverse medical outcomes, such as accelerated hepatic fibrosis, hepatic decompensation, and immune dysregulation. Due to higher mortality rates in co-infected individuals as a result of accelerated liver disease – in comparison to individuals with HIV mono-infection – pursuing HCV treatment and cure is a priority in these individuals with optimal suppression of HIV replication and avoidance of drug-drug interactions.

In individuals living with HIV, anti-retroviral therapy (ART) has been shown to preserve immune function, reduce the effects of HIV-related inflammation, and delay hepatic disease. Therefore, treatment plans for individuals with HIV/HCV co-infection include: an initial ART regimen (as recommended for HIV mono-infected individuals); simultaneous HCV treatment involving oral direct-acting antivirals (DAA); and special consideration given to potential for severe drug-drug interactions between the selected medication regimens. When initiating DAA therapy, the individual is typically assessed for ART-naivety. It is recommended that the individual, if not previously already on ART for HIV maintenance, initiate ART 4–6 weeks prior to DAA administration in order to adequately adjust to regimen and provide a greater foundation for efficacious response to HCV treatment.

=== HCV treatment options ===
The overall goal of HCV DAA therapy is to create a Sustained Virologic Response for 12 consecutive weeks (SVR12) to ensure the Hepatitis C virus is not detected in the blood. In clinical trials, the use of the following DAA combinations have shown similar efficacy rates (by achieving SVR12) in individuals with HIV/HCV co-infection as those with HCV mono-infection:

Elbasvir/Grazoprevir

- The Phase 3, open-label, single-arm C-EDGE CO-INFECTION Study showed that 96% (210 out of 218) of individuals with HCV genotype 1,4, or 6 and HIV co-infection were able to attain SVR12 at the end of the 12-week course of treatment.

Glecaprevir/Pibrentasvir

- The Phase 3, multi-center EXPEDITION-2 Study showed that an 8-week treatment in HIV/HCV co-infected individuals with HCV genotype 1, 2, 3, 4, or 6 without cirrhosis provided an overall SVR12 of 100% (136 out of 136 individuals), while a 12-week treatment in HIV/HCV co-infected individuals with HCV genotype 1, 2, 3, 4, or 6 with compensated cirrhosis provided an overall SVR12 of 93% (14 out of 15 individuals).

Ledipasvir/Sofosbuvir

- The multi-center, open-label, ION-4 Study showed that a 12-week course of treatment provided an overall SVR12 of 96% (321 out of 335 individuals) in individuals co-infected with HIV and HCV genotype 1 or 4.

Due to limited clinical safety data, the following DAA combinations, while available, are not considered as first-line therapies:

Sofosbuvir/Velpatasvir

- The safety and efficacy of sofosbuvir/velpatasvir was evaluated in a clinical trial of 267 subjects with decompensated cirrhosis (moderate to severe cirrhosis), of whom 87 subjects received sofosbuvir/velpatasvir in combination with ribavirin for 12 weeks, and 94 percent of these subjects had no virus detected in the blood 12 weeks after finishing treatment

Sofosbuvir/Velpatasvir/Voxilaprevir

- The safety and efficacy of sofosbuvir/velpatasvir/voxilaprevir was evaluated in two phase III clinical trials that enrolled approximately 750 adults without cirrhosis or with mild cirrhosis. Results of both trials demonstrated that 96–97 percent of participants who received the combination had no virus detected in the blood 12 weeks after finishing treatment, suggesting that participants’ infection had been cured.

=== Barriers to care ===
Barriers to care exist when discussing therapeutic options for HCV/HIV co-infected individuals. For example, other co-morbidities such as severe hepatic decompensation, cardiac disease, and renal disorders contribute to treatment barriers since these individuals would not be eligible for anti-retroviral therapy. Individuals with continued alcohol/drug/substance abuse and those that exhibit depressive symptoms along with suicidal ideations are also subject to ineligible status for HCV treatment in HCV/HIV co-infected persons.

== Epidemiology ==
At the lowest estimate, there are 35 million individuals infected with HIV and 80 million infected with Hepatitis C worldwide. With the significant global effect of each of these viruses, there is a considerable overlap of HIV-positive individuals co-infected with HCV. In fact, 20% of HIV-positive individuals also have Hepatitis C. This overlap is related to the common ways these viruses are spread, including contaminated blood and bodily fluids such as semen and vaginal fluids.

There are marked differences between groups affected by this co-infection. However, it is consistent that HIV-positive individuals have a higher prevalence of Hepatitis C infection. Of those co-infected with HIV and HCV, almost 60% are intravenous drug users, a high risk group for mono-infection with HIV or HCV. Additionally, prevalence varies by geographical location with the highest prevalence of co-infection located in North Africa and the Middle East versus the lowest prevalence located in East Africa.

== History ==
Over time, liver disease and its complications have arisen as both a morbidity and mortality concern for people with HIV. Studies have determined that co-infection with HIV and HCV is associated with both faster and more severe liver damage than HCV infection alone. In fact, mortality due to liver disease is now one of the top three causes of death in HIV-infected individuals, with 66% of these liver disease-related deaths due to concurrent HCV infection. Additionally, due to the development of novel therapies to treat HIV, antiretroviral therapies, HIV-positive individuals are taking chronic medications to prevent the progression of HIV to AIDS. However, these medications can have negative side effects on the liver, and can therefore worsen liver disease.

The effects of HIV infection on HCV have been widely studied. However, the data on the effects of HCV infection on HIV are conflicting. Some studies show that HCV infection does not affect HIV progression, while others have shown a faster progression of HIV in those co-infected with HCV. When considering this conflicting information, many of these studies were completed before the introduction of antiretroviral therapies for HIV, which are now the standard-of-care for HIV-positive individuals.
