= Idiopathic pulmonary haemosiderosis =

- Other names: Idiopathic pulmonary hemosiderosis
- Specialty: Respirology

Idiopathic pulmonary haemosiderosis (IPH) is a lung disease of unknown cause that is characterized by alveolar capillary bleeding and accumulation of haemosiderin in the lungs. It is rare, with an incidence between 0.24 and 1.23 cases per million people.

== Pathophysiology ==
Being idiopathic, IPH by definition has an unknown cause. It is thought to be an immune-mediated disease. The lung bleeding causes accumulation of iron, which in itself causes additional lung damage. Meanwhile, there is insufficient iron for inclusion into the haemoglobin molecules inside red blood cells which carry oxygen to body tissues for cellular respiration.

Idiopathic pulmonary haemosiderosis can occur either as a primary lung disorder or as the sequela to other pulmonary, cardiovascular or immune system disorder.

- PH1 involves PH with circulating anti-GBM antibodies.
- PH2 involves PH with immune complex disease such as systemic lupus erythematosus, SLE.
- PH3 involves no demonstrable immune system involvement.

A distinct subset of patients with pulmonary hemosiderosis has hypersensitivity to cow's milk which result in formation of IgG antibodies against basement membrane. This is called Heiner syndrome. Mechanism of haemorrhage is similar to that observed in Goodpasture syndrome.

=== Related or similar conditions ===
There are many pulmonary problems that may seem to mimic haemosiderosis but do not necessarily include the deposits of iron into the lung. The deposition of iron in the lungs, occurring in the form of haemosiderin, is the defining characteristic of this illness. These other conditions may occur separately or together with haemosiderosis.

- Pulmonary fibrosis
- Adult respiratory distress syndrome (ARDS)
- Immune complex disease
- intra-alveolar bleeding

== Diagnosis ==
Clinically, IPH manifests as a triad of haemoptysis, diffuse parenchymal infiltrates on chest radiographs, and iron deficiency anaemia. It is diagnosed at an average age of 4.5 plus or minus 3.5 years, and it is twice as common in females. The clinical course of IPH is exceedingly variable, and most of the patients continue to have episodes of pulmonary haemorrhage despite therapy. Death may occur suddenly from acute pulmonary haemorrhage or after progressive pulmonary insufficiency resulting in chronic respiratory failure.

== Treatment ==
Corticosteroids are the mainstay of treatment of IPH, though they are controversial and lack clear evidence in their favour. They are thought to decrease the frequency of haemorrhage, while other studies suggest that they do not have any effect on the course or prognosis of this disease. In either case, steroid therapy has significant side effects. Small trials have investigated the use of other medications, but none has emerged as a clear standard of care. This includes immune modulators such as hydroxychloroquine, azathioprine, and cyclophosphamide. 6-mercaptopurine as a long-term therapy may prevent pulmonary haemorrhage. A 2007 scientific letter reports preliminary success in preventing pulmonary haemorrhage with the anti-oxidant N-acetylcysteine.

== Prognosis ==
Death may occur rapidly with acute, massive pulmonary bleeding or over longer periods as the result of continued pulmonary failure and right heart failure. Historically, patients had an average survival of 2.5 years after diagnosis, but today 86% may survive beyond five years.

== History ==
The condition was first described as "brown lung induration" by Rudolf Virchow in 1864 in patients after their death. Wilhelm Ceelen later correlated his findings to the clinical symptoms of two children who died of IPH in 1931. The first living patient was diagnosed by Jan Waldenström in 1944. It has been given several names, including:

- Haemosiderin accumulation
- Pulmonary haemosiderosis
- Brown induration of lung
- Essential brown induration of lung
- Ceelen-Gellerstedt syndrome (after physicians Wilhelm Ceelen and Nils Gellerstedt)
