= Brown induration =

Lung disorder

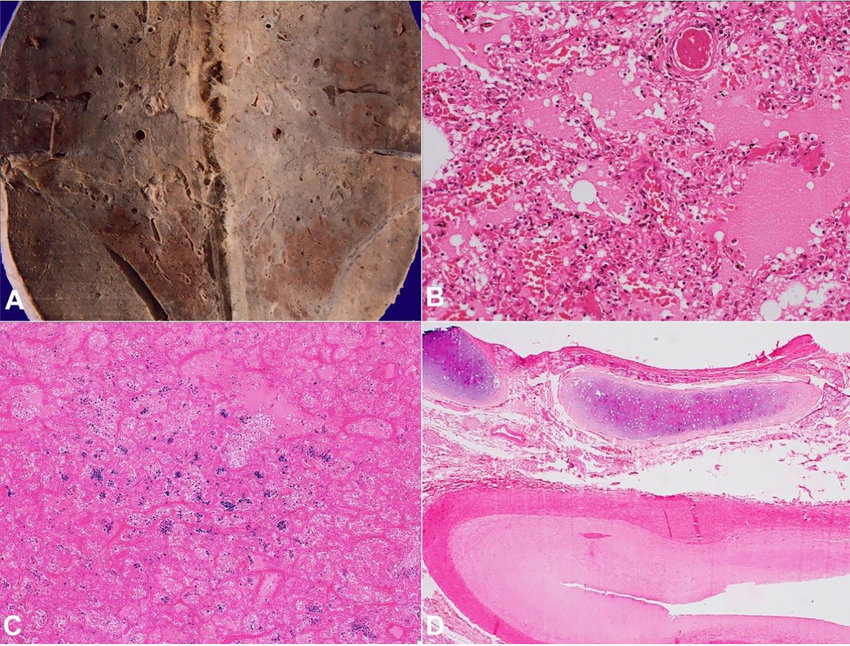
Lung with brown induration in the lower lobe, nodular lesions beneath thickened pleura, congested capillaries with erythrocyte extravasation, hemosiderin-laden macrophages, and pulmonary artery intimal hyperplasia.

Brown induration is fibrosis and hemosiderin pigmentation of the lungs due to long standing pulmonary congestion (chronic passive congestion). Occurs with mitral stenosis and left sided heart failure.

== Pathology ==
The lung vessels are congested with blood and this leads to pulmonary edema when plasma escapes in alveolar spaces. Rupture of congested capillaries leads to release of hemosiderin from damaged red blood cells. When alveolar macrophages engulf hemosiderin they are called heart failure cells. Death of heart failure cells in their journey back to lung tissue with subsequent hemosiderin release leads to lung fibrosis.
