= Jan G. Waldenström =

Swedish physician

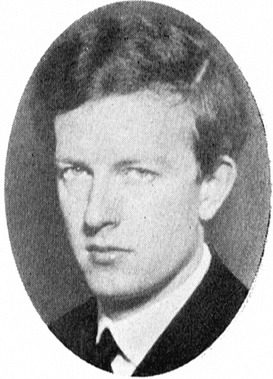
Jan G. Waldenström (undated)

Jan Gösta Waldenström (17 April 1906 – 1 December 1996) was a Swedish doctor of internal medicine, who first described the disease that bears his name, Waldenström macroglobulinemia.

He was born in Stockholm into a medical family: his father, Johann Henning Waldenström (1877–1972), was a professor of orthopedic surgery in Stockholm, and his grandfather Johan Anton Waldenström (1839–1879) was professor of internal medicine in Uppsala.

Waldenström obtained his M.D. degree at the University of Uppsala and studied organic chemistry with Hans Fischer at the Technical University of Munich. He was professor of theoretical medicine at the University of Uppsala in 1941 and became professor of practical medicine at the University of Lund in 1944. He was the head of the Department of Medicine at Malmö General Hospital until his retirement in 1972.

Waldenström first described, in 1944, patients with a disease that has subsequently been named for him, Waldenström's macroglobulinemia, a "hyperviscosity syndrome" in which symptoms are caused by abnormal lymphocytes that prevent normal bone marrow function, which causes anemia and hepatosplenomegaly, and secrete large immunoglobulins, causing bleeding difficulties.

Waldenström's other clinical investigations included studies on the various porphyrias, on the benign hypergammaglobulinemic purpura of Waldenström, on chronic active hepatitis, hemosiderosis, on Bruton's hypogammaglobulinemia, paraneoplastic phenomena and on carcinoid syndrome. He originated the concept of classification of gammopathies as "monoclonal gammopahies" vs. "polyclonal gammopathies" in 1961.

He was a member of the US National Academy of Sciences and the French Academy of Sciences and was an honorary member of the British Royal Society of Medicine.

== Publications ==
- J. Waldenström: Studien über Porphyrie, Dissertation. Acta Medica Scandinavica, Stockholm, 1937; supplement 82: 1–254.
- J. Waldenström: "The porphyrias as inborn errors of metabolism", The American Journal of Medicine, 1957, 22: 758–773.
- Jan G. Waldenström, Reflections and Recollections from a Long Life with Medicine, Rome, Ferrata Storti Foundation Publication, 1994. ISBN 88-7002-654-X.
- Waldenström J, Ljungberg E: Studies on the functional circulatory influence from metastasizing carcinoid (argentaffine, enterochromaffine) tumours and their possible relationship to enteramine production. Acta Med Scand 152:293, 1955
