= Hyperviscosity syndrome =

Increase in viscosity of the blood

- Specialty: Hematology

Hyperviscosity syndrome is a group of symptoms triggered by an increase in the viscosity of the blood. Symptoms of high blood viscosity include spontaneous bleeding from mucous membranes, visual disturbances due to retinopathy, and neurologic symptoms ranging from headache and vertigo to seizures and coma.

Hyperviscosity occurs from pathologic changes of either cellular or protein fractions of the blood such as is found in polycythemias, multiple myeloma (particularly IgA and IgG3), leukemia, monoclonal gammopathies such as Waldenström macroglobulinemia, sickle cell anemia, and sepsis.

Types of hyperviscosity syndromes vary by pathology; including serum hyperviscosity, which may cause neurologic or ocular disorders; polycythemic hyperviscosity, which results in reduced blood flow or capillary perfusion and increased organ congestion; and syndromes of hyperviscosity, caused by reduced deformability of red blood cells, often evident in sickle cell anemia.

== Cause ==
High cell counts are seen in conditions such as polycythemia (raised red blood cells) or leukemia (more white blood cells, especially in acute leukemia blast crises).

May occur with a white blood cell count greater than 100,000/mm^{3} (100 billion/L).

== Diagnosis ==
Although elevated whole blood viscosity is a better measure of hyperviscosity and more common and clinically important, serum viscosity and plasma viscosity are more frequently measured. Normal plasma viscosity is between 1.4 and 1.8 centipoise while symptoms from hyperviscosity typically occur greater than 4 centipoise (about 4 times more viscous than water) and require emergency treatment.

Patients will also have evidence of their underlying disorder. Those with myeloma will typically display a rouleaux formation on a peripheral smear and a large globulin gap, indicative of a significant paraprotein load. Although it used to be the case that test results would take a few days to return, the development of a new generation of automated clinical viscometers means that results can now be obtained within minutes, allowing accurate diagnosis and more targeted therapy. If hyperviscosity is confirmed, treatment can commence early on in the diagnosis. Fundoscopic examination reveals dilation of retinal veins and flame shaped retinal hemorrhages.

== Treatment ==
Plasmapheresis may be used to decrease viscosity in the case of myeloma, whereas leukapheresis or phlebotomy may be employed in a leukemic or polycythemic crisis, respectively. Blood transfusions should be used with caution as they can increase serum viscosity. Hydration is a temporizing measure to employ while preparing pheresis. Even after treatment, the condition will recur unless the underlying disorder is treated. Serum viscosity and electrophoresis are recommended before and after plasmapheresis in order to correlate viscosity and M-spike with patient symptoms. This correlation may be useful for anticipating the need for repeat plasmapheresis.

== See also ==
- Bing-Neel syndrome
- Waldenström macroglobulinemia
