= Cryoglobulinemic vasculitis =

Inflammation of small blood vessels due to cold-sensitive antibodies in the blood

- Specialty: Hematology

Cryoglobulinemic vasculitis is a form of inflammation affecting the blood vessels (vasculitis) caused by the deposition of abnormal proteins called cryoglobulins. These immunoglobulin proteins are soluble at normal body temperatures, but become insoluble below 37 °C (98.6 °F) and subsequently may aggregate within smaller blood vessels. Inflammation within these obstructed blood vessels is due to the deposition of complement proteins which activate inflammatory pathways.

Cryoglobulinemic vasculitis most commonly affect the skin, causing a raised, pinpoint rash on the lower extremities known as purpura. The kidneys may additionally be affected by this form of vasculitis, resulting in membranoproliferative glomerulonephritis. Fevers, painful muscles and joints, and peripheral nerve damage are other common manifestations of cryoglobulinemic vasculitis.

== Epidemiology ==
The incidence of cryoglobulinemic vasculitis is low and highly corresponds to the presence of hepatitis C virus infection, with increased prevalence in Southern Europe. Only about 30% of individuals with cryoglobulinemia develop vasculitis and associated symptoms. In a review of 279 patients, the average age of patients with symptomatic disease associated with hepatitis C virus was 54 years old, with an equal distribution between men and women.

== Pathophysiology ==
Cryoglobulinemia is classified according to the Brouet criteria based on immunoglobulin clonality and composition. Type II cryoglobulinemia is defined by immune complexes composed of monoclonal IgM (possessing rheumatoid factor activity) complexed with polyclonal IgG. In contrast, type III cryoglobulinemia consists of polyclonal IgM complexed with polyclonal IgG. In both mixed types (types II and III), the antigen-binding sites (Fab) of the IgM molecules bind specifically to the constant domain (Fc region) of circulating IgG antibodies. These large IgM-IgG immune complexes bind to endothelial cells and trigger the classical complement pathway, consuming complement component 4 (C4) and driving vascular inflammation.

In contrast, type I cryoglobulinemia causes damage solely due to hyperviscosity syndrome, which refers to the aggregation and resulting obstructing nature of cryoglobulins in blood vessels resulting in reduced perfusion of tissues and possibly necrosis if prolonged. Therefore, vasculitis generally occurs only in patients affected by mixed (type 2 and 3) cryoglobulinemia, as simple (type 1) cryoglobulinemia causes a hyperviscosity syndrome without complement activation.

The large majority of cases of cryoglobulinemic vasculitis are associated with underlying medical conditions which contribute to or exacerbate the pathophysiology, the most common being hepatitis C virus infection. There are a number of other rheumatologic, oncologic, inflammatory, and infectious associations including Sjogren's syndrome, B-cell lymphoma, rheumatoid arthritis, systemic lupus erythematous, and other hepatitis viral infections. Type III cryoglobulinemia is most associated with autoimmune conditions.

== Manifestations ==
At least 50% of patients with cryoglobulinemic vasculitis have only mild symptoms. More severe symptoms involve renal, gastrointestinal, and neurological damage with cardiovascular and respiratory complications presenting more rarely in a population of 279 patients with cryoglobulins and hepatitis C infection. Prevalence of these symptoms may vary depending on the underlying etiology contributing to the cryoglobulinemia.

Only about 5–10% of patients with cryoglobulins found in the bloodstream due to Hepatitis C virus develop symptoms. Approximately 20-40% of individuals with symptomatic cryoglobulinemic vasculitis eventually develop renal damage, usually years following initial diagnosis.

Relapse in cryoglobulinemic vasculitis refers to the reactivation of clinical vasculitic symptoms following documented clinical remission. A systematic review identified significant risk factors for relapse in non-infectious cryoglobulinemic vasculitis, including Type II cryoglobulinemia status (conferring a higher relapse rate compared to Type III), renal involvement at baseline, elevated circulating cryocrit levels, and incomplete depletion or early reconstitution of circulating CD19+ B cells following rituximab therapy.

== Diagnosis ==
The first step in quantitative assessment entails identification of the presence of cryoglobulins in the bloodstream, which can be a technically involved and inaccurate process with a high proportion of false-positives and false-negatives. Test tubes should be warmed to normal body temperature at 37 °C prior to collection of blood samples, which are centrifuged after the blood coagulates. This sample is then stored at reduced temperatures of 4 °C for a week. If present, cryoglobulins will form precipitate during this time and be visible as a white sedimented layer. If rewarmed from 4 °C to 37 °C, this precipitate will redissolve into the blood sample. Following centrifugation, the layer of cryoglobulins should be immunofixed and labeled to allow for classification of cryoglobulinemia type.

Other nonspecific inflammatory markers are often elevated, including C-reactive protein and erythrocyte sedimentation rate, but are not required for diagnosis. Baseline laboratory markers, including metabolic panels, urinalysis, and urine protein, should be obtained to trend renal function through progression of the disease and monitor for glomerulonephritis. Complement levels and rheumatoid factor activity should additionally be assessed given the pathophysiology of cryoglobulinemia.

Underlying inflammatory, infectious, and oncologic diseases should also be tested for as appropriate. Workup for viral RNA, autoantibodies, and malignant serological markers should be considered. Biopsy may be obtained to assess for immune complex deposition.

== Treatment ==
Management of cryoglobulinemic vasculitis is stratified according to the severity of organ involvement and the underlying etiology (infectious vs. non-infectious autoimmune):

- Hepatitis C-associated vasculitis: Front-line therapy for non-organ-threatening HCV-associated vasculitis centers on viral eradication using oral, interferon-free direct-acting antiviral (DAA) regimens (such as sofosbuvir/velpatasvir or glecaprevir/pibrentasvir), which achieve clinical and immunological remission in the majority of patients.
- Severe or life-threatening organ involvement: In patients presenting with rapidly progressive glomerulonephritis, active mononeuritis multiplex, extensive skin necrosis, or mesenteric ischemia, immediate immunosuppressive therapy is required prior to or concurrent with antiviral treatment. First-line regimens combine high-dose corticosteroids with the B-cell-depleting antibody rituximab or cyclophosphamide. Emergent plasmapheresis is indicated to rapidly remove circulating cryoglobulins in patients with progressive tissue ischemia or hyperviscosity.
- Non-infectious (autoimmune) vasculitis: For vasculitis secondary to Sjögren syndrome or systemic lupus erythematosus, treatment consists of immunosuppression using corticosteroids combined with rituximab, mycophenolate mofetil, or cyclophosphamide.
