= Rheumatoid factor =

Autoantibody found in rheumatoid arthritis

Rheumatoid factor (RF) is the autoantibody that was first found in rheumatoid arthritis. It is defined as an antibody against the Fc portion of IgG; different RFs can recognize different parts of the IgG-Fc. RF and IgG join to form immune complexes that contribute to the disease process such as chronic inflammation and joint destruction at the synovium and cartilage.

Rheumatoid factor can also be a cryoglobulin, an antibody that precipitates on cooling of a blood sample. It can either be a type 2 (monoclonal IgM to polyclonal IgG) or type 3 (polyclonal IgM to polyclonal IgG) cryoglobulin.

Although predominantly encountered as IgM, rheumatoid factor can be of any isotype of immunoglobulins: IgA, IgG, IgM, IgE, or IgD.

== Testing ==
RF is tested by collecting blood in a plain tube (5 mL is often enough). The serum is tested for the presence of RF. There are different methods available, which include nephelometry, turbidimetry, agglutination of gamma globulin-coated latex particles or erythrocytes. RF is often evaluated in patients suspected of having any form of arthritis, even though positive results can be due to other causes and negative results do not rule out disease. In combination with signs and symptoms, it can play a role in both diagnosis and disease prognosis. It is part of the usual disease criteria of rheumatoid arthritis.

The presence of rheumatoid factor in serum can also indicate the occurrence of suspected autoimmune activity unrelated to rheumatoid arthritis, such as that associated with tissue or organ rejection. In such instances, RF may serve as one of several serological markers for autoimmunity. The sensitivity of RF for established rheumatoid arthritis is only 60 to 70 percent with a specificity of 78 percent.

Rheumatoid factor is part of the 2010 ACR/EULAR classification criteria for rheumatoid arthritis. RF positivity combines well with anti-CCP and/or 14-3-3η (YWHAH) to inform diagnosis. RF positivity at baseline has also been described as a good prognostic marker for future radiographic damage.

== Interpretation ==
High levels of rheumatoid factor (in general, above 20 IU/mL, 1:40, or over the 95th percentile; there is some variation among labs) occur in rheumatoid arthritis (present in 80%) and Sjögren's disease (present in 50-70% of primary forms of disease). The higher the level of RF the greater the probability of destructive articular disease. It is also found in Epstein–Barr virus or Parvovirus infection and in 5–10% of healthy persons, especially the elderly.

There is an association between rheumatoid factor and more persistently active synovitis, more joint damage, greater eventual disability and arthritis.

Other than in rheumatoid arthritis, rheumatoid factor may also be elevated in other conditions, including:

- Systemic lupus erythematosus (SLE)
- Sjögren's disease
- Hepatitis B and C, herpes, HIV, and other viral infections
- Primary biliary cirrhosis
- Infectious mononucleosis and any chronic viral infection
- Leprosy
- Sarcoidosis
- Tuberculosis, syphilis and other chronic bacterial infections
- Visceral leishmaniasis
- Malaria and other parasitic infections
- Cancer

== History ==
The test was first described by Norwegian Dr Erik Waaler in 1940 and redescribed by Dr Harry M. Rose and colleagues in 1948. Redescription is said to be due to the uncertainties due to World War II. It is still referred to as the Waaler–Rose test.
