= List of MeSH codes (C20) =

The following is a partial list of the "C" codes for Medical Subject Headings (MeSH), as defined by the United States National Library of Medicine (NLM).

This list continues the information at List of MeSH codes (C19). Codes following these are found at List of MeSH codes (C21). For other MeSH codes, see List of MeSH codes.

The source for this content is the set of 2006 MeSH Trees from the NLM.

== MeSH C20 – immune system diseases ==
=== MeSH C20.111 – autoimmune diseases ===
==== MeSH C20.111.199 – arthritis, rheumatoid ====
- MeSH C20.111.199.114 – arthritis, juvenile rheumatoid
- MeSH C20.111.199.389 – Felty's syndrome
- MeSH C20.111.199.774 – Sjögren syndrome
- MeSH C20.111.199.856 – spondylitis, ankylosing
- MeSH C20.111.199.870 – Still's disease, adult-onset

==== MeSH C20.111.258 – autoimmune diseases of the nervous system ====
- MeSH C20.111.258.250 – demyelinating autoimmune diseases, cns
- MeSH C20.111.258.250.175 – diffuse cerebral sclerosis of schilder
- MeSH C20.111.258.250.350 – encephalomyelitis, acute disseminated
- MeSH C20.111.258.250.425 – leukoencephalitis, acute hemorrhagic
- MeSH C20.111.258.250.500 – multiple sclerosis
- MeSH C20.111.258.250.500.200 – multiple sclerosis, chronic progressive
- MeSH C20.111.258.250.500.600 – multiple sclerosis, relapsing-remitting
- MeSH C20.111.258.250.500.650 – neuromyelitis optica
- MeSH C20.111.258.250.550 – myelitis, transverse
- MeSH C20.111.258.250.550.500 – neuromyelitis optica
- MeSH C20.111.258.250.600 – neuromyelitis optica
- MeSH C20.111.258.350 – Lambert–Eaton myasthenic syndrome
- MeSH C20.111.258.450 – leukoencephalitis, acute hemorrhagic
- MeSH C20.111.258.500 – myasthenia gravis
- MeSH C20.111.258.500.300 – myasthenia gravis, autoimmune, experimental
- MeSH C20.111.258.500.650 – myasthenia gravis, neonatal
- MeSH C20.111.258.625 – nervous system autoimmune disease, experimental
- MeSH C20.111.258.625.300 – encephalomyelitis, autoimmune, experimental
- MeSH C20.111.258.625.350 – myasthenia gravis, autoimmune, experimental
- MeSH C20.111.258.625.700 – neuritis, autoimmune, experimental
- MeSH C20.111.258.750 – polyradiculoneuropathy
- MeSH C20.111.258.750.400 – Guillain–Barré syndrome
- MeSH C20.111.258.750.400.500 – Miller Fisher syndrome
- MeSH C20.111.258.750.600 – hereditary sensory and autonomic neuropathies
- MeSH C20.111.258.750.600.250 – dysautonomia, familial
- MeSH C20.111.258.750.800 – polyradiculoneuropathy, chronic inflammatory demyelinating
- MeSH C20.111.258.850 – stiff-person syndrome
- MeSH C20.111.258.925 – uveomeningoencephalitic syndrome
- MeSH C20.111.258.962 – vasculitis, central nervous system
- MeSH C20.111.258.962.400 – lupus vasculitis, central nervous system
- MeSH C20.111.258.962.800 – temporal arteritis

==== MeSH C20.111.555 – Graves' disease ====
- MeSH C20.111.555.500 – Graves' ophthalmopathy

==== MeSH C20.111.590 – lupus erythematosus, systemic ====
- MeSH C20.111.590.560 – lupus nephritis
- MeSH C20.111.590.750 – lupus vasculitis, central nervous system

==== MeSH C20.111.736 – pemphigus ====
- MeSH C20.111.736.700 – pemphigus, benign familial

=== MeSH C20.188 – blood group incompatibility ===
==== MeSH C20.188.413 – erythroblastosis, fetal ====
- MeSH C20.188.413.480 – hydrops fetalis
- MeSH C20.188.413.502 – kernicterus

=== MeSH C20.543 – hypersensitivity ===
==== MeSH C20.543.206 – drug hypersensitivity ====
- MeSH C20.543.206.380 – drug eruptions
- MeSH C20.543.206.380.350 – epidermal necrolysis, toxic
- MeSH C20.543.206.380.375 – erythema nodosum
- MeSH C20.543.206.380.800 – serum sickness

==== MeSH C20.543.312 – environmental illness ====
- MeSH C20.543.312.500 – multiple chemical sensitivity
- MeSH C20.543.312.750 – sick building syndrome

==== MeSH C20.543.418 – hypersensitivity, delayed ====
- MeSH C20.543.418.150 – dermatitis, allergic contact
- MeSH C20.543.418.150.600 – dermatitis, photoallergic
- MeSH C20.543.418.150.700 – dermatitis, toxicodendron

==== MeSH C20.543.480 – hypersensitivity, immediate ====
- MeSH C20.543.480.099 – anaphylaxis
- MeSH C20.543.480.200 – conjunctivitis, allergic
- MeSH C20.543.480.343 – dermatitis, atopic
- MeSH C20.543.480.370 – food hypersensitivity
- MeSH C20.543.480.370.150 – egg hypersensitivity
- MeSH C20.543.480.370.500 – milk hypersensitivity
- MeSH C20.543.480.370.550 – nut hypersensitivity
- MeSH C20.543.480.370.675 – peanut hypersensitivity
- MeSH C20.543.480.370.850 – wheat hypersensitivity
- MeSH C20.543.480.680 – respiratory hypersensitivity
- MeSH C20.543.480.680.075 – alveolitis, extrinsic allergic
- MeSH C20.543.480.680.075.125 – bird fancier's lung
- MeSH C20.543.480.680.075.365 – farmer's lung
- MeSH C20.543.480.680.085 – aspergillosis, allergic bronchopulmonary
- MeSH C20.543.480.680.095 – asthma
- MeSH C20.543.480.680.095.110 – asthma, exercise-induced
- MeSH C20.543.480.680.095.880 – status asthmaticus
- MeSH C20.543.480.680.791 – rhinitis, allergic, perennial
- MeSH C20.543.480.680.795 – rhinitis, allergic, seasonal
- MeSH C20.543.480.904 – urticaria
- MeSH C20.543.480.904.066 – angioneurotic edema

==== MeSH C20.543.520 – immune complex diseases ====
- MeSH C20.543.520.100 – arthus reaction
- MeSH C20.543.520.770 – serum sickness
- MeSH C20.543.520.910 – vasculitis, hypersensitivity
- MeSH C20.543.520.910.580 – purpura, schoenlein-henoch
- MeSH C20.543.520.910.952 – vasculitis, allergic cutaneous

=== MeSH C20.673 – immunologic deficiency syndromes ===
==== MeSH C20.673.430 – dysgammaglobulinemia ====
- MeSH C20.673.430.500 – IgA deficiency
- MeSH C20.673.430.750 – IgG deficiency

==== MeSH C20.673.480 – hiv infections ====
- MeSH C20.673.480.040 – acquired immunodeficiency syndrome
- MeSH C20.673.480.048 – aids arteritis, central nervous system
- MeSH C20.673.480.050 – aids-associated nephropathy
- MeSH C20.673.480.070 – aids dementia complex
- MeSH C20.673.480.080 – aids-related complex
- MeSH C20.673.480.100 – aids-related opportunistic infections
- MeSH C20.673.480.400 – hiv-associated lipodystrophy syndrome
- MeSH C20.673.480.480 – hiv enteropathy
- MeSH C20.673.480.500 – hiv seropositivity
- MeSH C20.673.480.520 – hiv wasting syndrome

==== MeSH C20.673.483 – deltaretrovirus infections ====
- MeSH C20.673.483.260 – enzootic bovine leukosis
- MeSH C20.673.483.470 – htlv-i infections
- MeSH C20.673.483.470.300 – leukemia-lymphoma, t-cell, acute, htlv-i-associated
- MeSH C20.673.483.480 – htlv-ii infections
- MeSH C20.673.483.480.350 – leukemia, t-cell, htlv-ii-associated

==== MeSH C20.673.627 – lymphopenia ====
- MeSH C20.673.627.800 – t-lymphocytopenia, idiopathic cd4-positive

==== MeSH C20.673.774 – phagocyte bactericidal dysfunction ====
- MeSH C20.673.774.257 – Chédiak–Higashi syndrome
- MeSH C20.673.774.257.270 – Aleutian mink disease
- MeSH C20.673.774.535 – granulomatous disease, chronic
- MeSH C20.673.774.600 – Job's syndrome

=== MeSH C20.683 – immunoproliferative disorders ===
==== MeSH C20.683.460 – hypergammaglobulinemia ====
- MeSH C20.683.460.640 – monoclonal gammopathies, benign

==== MeSH C20.683.515 – lymphoproliferative disorders ====
- MeSH C20.683.515.250 – giant lymph node hyperplasia
- MeSH C20.683.515.501 – immunoblastic lymphadenopathy
- MeSH C20.683.515.512 – immunoproliferative small intestinal disease
- MeSH C20.683.515.515 – infectious mononucleosis
- MeSH C20.683.515.517 – leukemia, hairy cell
- MeSH C20.683.515.528 – leukemia, lymphocytic
- MeSH C20.683.515.639 – leukemia, myeloid
- MeSH C20.683.515.639.550 – leukemia, nonlymphocytic, acute
- MeSH C20.683.515.639.550.512 – leukemia, myelocytic, acute
- MeSH C20.683.515.695 – leukemia, plasmacytic
- MeSH C20.683.515.710 – lymphangiomyoma
- MeSH C20.683.515.710.465 – lymphangioleiomyomatosis
- MeSH C20.683.515.761 – lymphoma
- MeSH C20.683.515.761.355 – Hodgkin disease
- MeSH C20.683.515.761.480 – lymphoma, non-Hodgkin
- MeSH C20.683.515.761.480.150 – lymphoma, b-cell
- MeSH C20.683.515.761.480.150.165 – Burkitt's lymphoma
- MeSH C20.683.515.761.480.150.450 – lymphoma, aids-related
- MeSH C20.683.515.761.480.150.570 – lymphoma, mucosa-associated lymphoid tissue
- MeSH C20.683.515.761.480.150.700 – lymphoma, small-cell
- MeSH C20.683.515.761.480.300 – lymphoma, diffuse
- MeSH C20.683.515.761.480.300.300 – lymphoma, large-cell, diffuse
- MeSH C20.683.515.761.480.300.450 – lymphoma, large-cell, immunoblastic
- MeSH C20.683.515.761.480.300.475 – lymphoma, lymphoblastic
- MeSH C20.683.515.761.480.300.500 – lymphoma, mixed-cell, diffuse
- MeSH C20.683.515.761.480.300.725 – lymphoma, small cleaved-cell, diffuse
- MeSH C20.683.515.761.480.300.725.500 – lymphoma, mantle-cell
- MeSH C20.683.515.761.480.300.750 – lymphoma, small lymphocytic
- MeSH C20.683.515.761.480.300.775 – lymphoma, small noncleaved-cell
- MeSH C20.683.515.761.480.350 – lymphoma, follicular
- MeSH C20.683.515.761.480.350.350 – lymphoma, large-cell, follicular
- MeSH C20.683.515.761.480.350.525 – lymphoma, mixed-cell, follicular
- MeSH C20.683.515.761.480.350.750 – lymphoma, small cleaved-cell, follicular
- MeSH C20.683.515.761.480.425 – lymphoma, high-grade
- MeSH C20.683.515.761.480.425.450 – lymphoma, large-cell, immunoblastic
- MeSH C20.683.515.761.480.425.475 – lymphoma, lymphoblastic
- MeSH C20.683.515.761.480.425.775 – lymphoma, small noncleaved-cell
- MeSH C20.683.515.761.480.425.775.165 – Burkitt's lymphoma
- MeSH C20.683.515.761.480.450 – lymphoma, intermediate-grade
- MeSH C20.683.515.761.480.450.300 – lymphoma, large-cell, diffuse
- MeSH C20.683.515.761.480.450.350 – lymphoma, large-cell, follicular
- MeSH C20.683.515.761.480.450.500 – lymphoma, mixed-cell, diffuse
- MeSH C20.683.515.761.480.450.725 – lymphoma, small cleaved-cell, diffuse
- MeSH C20.683.515.761.480.450.725.500 – lymphoma, mantle-cell
- MeSH C20.683.515.761.480.475 – lymphoma, large-cell
- MeSH C20.683.515.761.480.475.300 – lymphoma, large-cell, diffuse
- MeSH C20.683.515.761.480.475.350 – lymphoma, large-cell, follicular
- MeSH C20.683.515.761.480.475.450 – lymphoma, large-cell, immunoblastic
- MeSH C20.683.515.761.480.475.465 – lymphoma, large-cell, ki-1
- MeSH C20.683.515.761.480.475.475 – lymphoma, lymphoblastic
- MeSH C20.683.515.761.480.500 – lymphoma, low-grade
- MeSH C20.683.515.761.480.500.525 – lymphoma, mixed-cell, follicular
- MeSH C20.683.515.761.480.500.570 – lymphoma, mucosa-associated lymphoid tissue
- MeSH C20.683.515.761.480.500.750 – lymphoma, small cleaved-cell, follicular
- MeSH C20.683.515.761.480.500.770 – lymphoma, small lymphocytic
- MeSH C20.683.515.761.480.550 – lymphoma, mixed-cell
- MeSH C20.683.515.761.480.550.500 – lymphoma, mixed-cell, diffuse
- MeSH C20.683.515.761.480.550.525 – lymphoma, mixed-cell, follicular
- MeSH C20.683.515.761.480.700 – lymphoma, small-cell
- MeSH C20.683.515.761.480.700.725 – lymphoma, small cleaved-cell, diffuse
- MeSH C20.683.515.761.480.700.725.500 – lymphoma, mantle-cell
- MeSH C20.683.515.761.480.700.730 – lymphoma, small cleaved-cell, follicular
- MeSH C20.683.515.761.480.700.750 – lymphoma, small lymphocytic
- MeSH C20.683.515.761.480.700.775 – lymphoma, small noncleaved-cell
- MeSH C20.683.515.761.480.750 – lymphoma, t-cell
- MeSH C20.683.515.761.480.750.475 – lymphoma, lymphoblastic
- MeSH C20.683.515.761.480.750.800 – lymphoma, t-cell, cutaneous
- MeSH C20.683.515.761.480.750.800.465 – lymphoma, large-cell, ki-1
- MeSH C20.683.515.761.480.750.800.550 – mycosis fungoides
- MeSH C20.683.515.761.480.750.800.775 – Sézary syndrome
- MeSH C20.683.515.761.480.750.825 – lymphoma, t-cell, peripheral
- MeSH C20.683.515.761.480.875 – lymphoma, undifferentiated
- MeSH C20.683.515.761.480.875.300 – lymphoma, large-cell, diffuse
- MeSH C20.683.515.761.480.875.775 – lymphoma, small noncleaved-cell
- MeSH C20.683.515.761.480.875.775.165 – Burkitt's lymphoma
- MeSH C20.683.515.761.720 – plasmacytoma
- MeSH C20.683.515.761.720.550 – multiple myeloma
- MeSH C20.683.515.761.802 – reticuloendotheliosis
- MeSH C20.683.515.761.802.750 – mast-cell sarcoma
- MeSH C20.683.515.840 – Marek's disease
- MeSH C20.683.515.920 – Sézary syndrome
- MeSH C20.683.515.950 – tumor lysis syndrome

==== MeSH C20.683.780 – paraproteinemias ====
- MeSH C20.683.780.250 – cryoglobulinemia
- MeSH C20.683.780.490 – heavy chain disease
- MeSH C20.683.780.490.512 – immunoproliferative small intestinal disease
- MeSH C20.683.780.640 – monoclonal gammopathies, benign
- MeSH C20.683.780.640.700 – Schnitzler syndrome
- MeSH C20.683.780.650 – multiple myeloma
- MeSH C20.683.780.750 – POEMS syndrome
- MeSH C20.683.780.925 – waldenstrom macroglobulinemia

=== MeSH C20.841 – purpura, thrombocytopenic ===
==== MeSH C20.841.600 – purpura, thrombocytopenic, idiopathic ====
The list continues at List of MeSH codes (C21).
