= List of MeSH codes (C19) =

The following is a partial list of the "C" codes for Medical Subject Headings (MeSH), as defined by the United States National Library of Medicine (NLM).

This list continues the information at List of MeSH codes (C18). Codes following these are found at List of MeSH codes (C20). For other MeSH codes, see List of MeSH codes.

The source for this content is the set of 2006 MeSH Trees from the NLM.

== MeSH C19 – endocrine system diseases ==
=== MeSH C19.053 – adrenal gland diseases ===
==== MeSH C19.053.098 – adrenal cortex diseases ====
- MeSH C19.053.098.265 – adrenal cortex neoplasms
- MeSH C19.053.098.265.500 – adrenocortical adenoma
- MeSH C19.053.098.265.750 – adrenocortical carcinoma

==== MeSH C19.053.347 – adrenal gland neoplasms ====
- MeSH C19.053.347.500 – adrenal cortex neoplasms
- MeSH C19.053.347.500.500 – adrenocortical adenoma
- MeSH C19.053.347.500.750 – adrenocortical carcinoma

==== MeSH C19.053.500 – adrenal insufficiency ====
- MeSH C19.053.500.263 – addison disease
- MeSH C19.053.500.270 – adrenoleukodystrophy
- MeSH C19.053.500.480 – hypoaldosteronism
- MeSH C19.053.500.740 – waterhouse-friderichsen syndrome

==== MeSH C19.053.800 – adrenocortical hyperfunction ====
- MeSH C19.053.800.367 – cushing syndrome
- MeSH C19.053.800.604 – hyperaldosteronism
- MeSH C19.053.800.604.249 – bartter syndrome

=== MeSH C19.246 – diabetes mellitus ===
==== MeSH C19.246.099 – diabetes complications ====
- MeSH C19.246.099.500 – diabetic angiopathies
- MeSH C19.246.099.500.191 – diabetic foot
- MeSH C19.246.099.500.382 – diabetic retinopathy
- MeSH C19.246.099.750 – diabetic coma
- MeSH C19.246.099.750.490 – hyperglycemic hyperosmolar nonketotic coma
- MeSH C19.246.099.812 – diabetic ketoacidosis
- MeSH C19.246.099.875 – diabetic nephropathies
- MeSH C19.246.099.937 – diabetic neuropathies
- MeSH C19.246.099.937.250 – diabetic foot
- MeSH C19.246.099.968 – fetal macrosomia

==== MeSH C19.246.267 – diabetes mellitus, type 1 ====
- MeSH C19.246.267.960 – wolfram syndrome

==== MeSH C19.246.300 – diabetes mellitus, type 2 ====
- MeSH C19.246.300.500 – diabetes mellitus, lipoatrophic

=== MeSH C19.344 – endocrine gland neoplasms ===
==== MeSH C19.344.078 – adrenal gland neoplasms ====
- MeSH C19.344.078.265 – adrenal cortex neoplasms
- MeSH C19.344.078.265.500 – adrenocortical adenoma
- MeSH C19.344.078.265.750 – adrenocortical carcinoma

==== MeSH C19.344.400 – multiple endocrine neoplasia ====
- MeSH C19.344.400.500 – multiple endocrine neoplasia type 1
- MeSH C19.344.400.505 – multiple endocrine neoplasia type 2a
- MeSH C19.344.400.510 – multiple endocrine neoplasia type 2b

==== MeSH C19.344.410 – ovarian neoplasms ====
- MeSH C19.344.410.398 – granulosa cell tumor
- MeSH C19.344.410.464 – luteoma
- MeSH C19.344.410.531 – meigs syndrome
- MeSH C19.344.410.648 – sertoli-leydig cell tumor
- MeSH C19.344.410.765 – thecoma

==== MeSH C19.344.421 – pancreatic neoplasms ====
- MeSH C19.344.421.249 – adenoma, islet cell
- MeSH C19.344.421.249.500 – insulinoma
- MeSH C19.344.421.500 – carcinoma, islet cell
- MeSH C19.344.421.500.124 – gastrinoma
- MeSH C19.344.421.500.249 – glucagonoma
- MeSH C19.344.421.500.500 – somatostatinoma
- MeSH C19.344.421.500.750 – vipoma
- MeSH C19.344.421.750 – carcinoma, pancreatic ductal

==== MeSH C19.344.609 – pituitary neoplasms ====
- MeSH C19.344.609.145 – acth-secreting pituitary adenoma
- MeSH C19.344.609.145.500 – nelson syndrome
- MeSH C19.344.609.292 – growth hormone-secreting pituitary adenoma
- MeSH C19.344.609.792 – prolactinoma

==== MeSH C19.344.762 – testicular neoplasms ====
- MeSH C19.344.762.500 – sertoli-leydig cell tumor

==== MeSH C19.344.894 – thyroid neoplasms ====
- MeSH C19.344.894.800 – thyroid nodule

=== MeSH C19.391 – gonadal disorders ===
==== MeSH C19.391.482 – hypogonadism ====
- MeSH C19.391.482.293 – eunuchism
- MeSH C19.391.482.600 – Kallmann syndrome
- MeSH C19.391.482.629 – Klinefelter syndrome
- MeSH C19.391.482.814 – sexual infantilism

==== MeSH C19.391.630 – ovarian diseases ====
- MeSH C19.391.630.050 – anovulation
- MeSH C19.391.630.450 – oophoritis
- MeSH C19.391.630.580 – ovarian cysts
- MeSH C19.391.630.580.765 – polyendocrine metabolic ovarian syndrome
- MeSH C19.391.630.611 – ovarian failure, premature
- MeSH C19.391.630.642 – ovarian hyperstimulation syndrome
- MeSH C19.391.630.705 – ovarian neoplasms
- MeSH C19.391.630.705.265 – brenner tumor
- MeSH C19.391.630.705.331 – carcinoma, endometrioid
- MeSH C19.391.630.705.398 – granulosa cell tumor
- MeSH C19.391.630.705.464 – luteoma
- MeSH C19.391.630.705.531 – meigs syndrome
- MeSH C19.391.630.705.648 – sertoli-leydig cell tumor
- MeSH C19.391.630.705.765 – thecoma

==== MeSH C19.391.775 – sex differentiation disorders ====
- MeSH C19.391.775.129 – adrenogenital syndrome
- MeSH C19.391.775.260 – freemartinism
- MeSH C19.391.775.309 – gonadal dysgenesis
- MeSH C19.391.775.309.193 – gonadal dysgenesis, 46,xx
- MeSH C19.391.775.309.388 – gonadal dysgenesis, 46,xy
- MeSH C19.391.775.309.391 – gonadal dysgenesis, mixed
- MeSH C19.391.775.309.872 – turner syndrome
- MeSH C19.391.775.316 – hermaphroditism
- MeSH C19.391.775.316.313 – hermaphroditism, true
- MeSH C19.391.775.316.627 – pseudohermaphroditism
- MeSH C19.391.775.316.627.500 – androgen-insensitivity syndrome
- MeSH C19.391.775.370 – hyperandrogenism
- MeSH C19.391.775.425 – kallmann syndrome
- MeSH C19.391.775.454 – klinefelter syndrome

==== MeSH C19.391.829 – testicular diseases ====
- MeSH C19.391.829.258 – cryptorchidism
- MeSH C19.391.829.493 – orchitis
- MeSH C19.391.829.782 – testicular neoplasms
- MeSH C19.391.829.782.500 – sertoli-leydig cell tumor

=== MeSH C19.642 – parathyroid diseases ===
==== MeSH C19.642.355 – hyperparathyroidism ====
- MeSH C19.642.355.239 – hyperparathyroidism, primary
- MeSH C19.642.355.480 – hyperparathyroidism, secondary
- MeSH C19.642.355.480.500 – renal osteodystrophy

==== MeSH C19.642.482 – hypoparathyroidism ====
- MeSH C19.642.482.500 – digeorge syndrome

=== MeSH C19.700 – pituitary diseases ===
==== MeSH C19.700.159 – diabetes insipidus ====
- MeSH C19.700.159.750 – diabetes insipidus, neurogenic
- MeSH C19.700.159.875 – wolfram syndrome

==== MeSH C19.700.355 – hyperpituitarism ====
- MeSH C19.700.355.179 – acromegaly
- MeSH C19.700.355.528 – gigantism
- MeSH C19.700.355.600 – hyperprolactinemia
- MeSH C19.700.355.800 – pituitary acth hypersecretion

==== MeSH C19.700.482 – hypopituitarism ====
- MeSH C19.700.482.311 – dwarfism, pituitary

==== MeSH C19.700.734 – pituitary neoplasms ====
- MeSH C19.700.734.145 – acth-secreting pituitary adenoma
- MeSH C19.700.734.145.500 – nelson syndrome
- MeSH C19.700.734.292 – growth hormone-secreting pituitary adenoma
- MeSH C19.700.734.792 – prolactinoma

=== MeSH C19.874 – thyroid diseases ===
==== MeSH C19.874.283 – goiter ====
- MeSH C19.874.283.300 – goiter, endemic
- MeSH C19.874.283.501 – goiter, nodular
- MeSH C19.874.283.601 – goiter, substernal
- MeSH C19.874.283.605 – Graves' disease
- MeSH C19.874.283.605.500 – Graves' ophthalmopathy
- MeSH C19.874.283.802 – lingual goiter

==== MeSH C19.874.397 – hyperthyroidism ====
- MeSH C19.874.397.370 – Graves' disease
- MeSH C19.874.397.370.500 – Graves' ophthalmopathy
- MeSH C19.874.397.685 – thyrotoxicosis
- MeSH C19.874.397.685.905 – thyroid crisis

==== MeSH C19.874.410 – hyperthyroxinemia ====
- MeSH C19.874.410.249 – hyperthyroxinemia, familial dysalbuminemic
- MeSH C19.874.410.500 – thyroid hormone resistance syndrome

==== MeSH C19.874.482 – hypothyroidism ====
- MeSH C19.874.482.281 – congenital hypothyroidism
- MeSH C19.874.482.638 – myxedema

==== MeSH C19.874.689 – thyroid dysgenesis ====
- MeSH C19.874.689.500 – lingual thyroid
- MeSH C19.874.689.500.500 – lingual goiter

==== MeSH C19.874.788 – thyroid neoplasms ====
- MeSH C19.874.788.800 – thyroid nodule

==== MeSH C19.874.871 – thyroiditis ====
- MeSH C19.874.871.102 – thyroiditis, autoimmune
- MeSH C19.874.871.102.500 – hashimoto disease
- MeSH C19.874.871.102.750 – postpartum thyroiditis
- MeSH C19.874.871.900 – thyroiditis, subacute
- MeSH C19.874.871.910 – thyroiditis, suppurative

==== MeSH C19.874.902 – thyrotoxicosis ====
- MeSH C19.874.902.905 – thyroid crisis

=== MeSH C19.927 – tuberculosis, endocrine ===
The list continues at List of MeSH codes (C20).
