= C31H46O2 =

The molecular formula C_{31}H_{46}O_{2} (molar mass: 450.69 g/mol, exact mass: 450.3498 u) may refer to:

- Phytomenadione, also known as phylloquinone or Vitamin K_{1}
