= Michael Laposata =

American pathologist

Michael Laposata is an American pathologist, fatty acid biochemist and specialist in blood coagulation. He was chair of the Department of Pathology at the University of Texas Medical Branch (UTMB) in Galveston and previously directed clinical laboratories at Massachusetts General Hospital and Vanderbilt University. He is known for developing diagnostic management teams to recommend the correct tests and provide expert driven, patient specific interpretations of test results. He is also well known for his work on bleeding disorders misdiagnosed as child abuse, and as a plaintiff in the 2024 lawsuit that overturned the U.S. Food and Drug Administration's rule on laboratory developed tests. In 2026, after retiring from academic medicine, Laposata founded ExpertDx, Inc. a company that offers provider-to-provider diagnostic consultations to ordering clinicians, extending the diagnostic management team model beyond individual hospitals.

== Education ==
Laposata joined the faculty of the University of Pennsylvania School of Medicine as an assistant professor in 1985.In 1989 he became Director of Clinical Laboratories at Massachusetts General Hospital, where he was also on the faculty of Harvard Medical School ultimately as a tenured full professor.

He moved to Vanderbilt University School of Medicine in 2008 where he was the Pathologist-in-Chief at Vanderbilt University Hospital.He joined the University of Texas Medical Branch in Galveston as professor and chair of the Department of Pathology in 2014. He also directed UTMB's MD-PhD program.

At all three institutions he built diagnostic management teams to provide ordering physicians an expert's interpretation of complex laboratory results, with recommended next steps.He organized three national conferences on forming diagnostic management teams.

Laposata retired from academic medicine in September of 2026.

== Career ==
In 1985 Laposata joined the University of Pennsylvania School of Medicine as an assistant professor. In 1989, he became Director of Clinical Laboratories at the Massachusetts General Hospital. In 2008, he joined Vanderbilt University School of Medicine.

Over a period of 20 years he researched and collected cases of diseases that led to child abuse misdiagnoses. In 2005, he co-published a study in which he focused on diseases that can cause bleeding disorders like Von Willebrand disease, Vitamin K deficiency, leukemia, idiopathic thrombocytopenic purpura, and Henoch-Schonlein purpura. According to Laposata, it's difficult to differentiate between bruises as a result of a disease and child abuse, and such a misdiagnosis can lead to people being wrongfully incarcerated on child abuse charges.

== Research and Contributions ==
Laposata is the author of Laposata's Laboratory Medicine: Diagnosis of Disease in the Clinical Laboratory (McGraw Hill), now in its fourth edition., and several books specifically focused on coagulation disorders. He has published more than 200 peer-reviewed papers focusing on fatty acid metabolism and diagnostic studies in coagulation and diagnostic errors.

As an expert in bleeding and clotting disorders that can mimic child abuse, his testimony has been reported to have contributed to exonerations and to children being returned to their families.

== Policy and advocacy ==
Laposata served on the Institute of Medicine Committee on Diagnostic Error in Health Care. The committee produced the 2015 report Improving Diagnosis in Health Care. In August 2024 he served the Association for Molecular Pathology as a plaintiff in a lawsuit challenging the FDA's final rule on regulating laboratory developed tests. In 2025 a federal district court in Texas vacated the rule. That November, the Association for Molecular Pathology gave him its Champion for Innovation Award for his role in the case.

== Selected Awards & Recognition ==
- 14 teaching awards from Harvard University, Massachusetts General Hospital and the University of Pennsylvania School of Medicine.
- Named the most influential pathologist in the United States by The Pathologist in 2015
- Inducted into the Association for Diagnostics & Laboratory Medicine (ADLM) Hall of Fame.
- Champion for Innovation Award, Association for Molecular Pathology, 2025

== Bibliography ==
- Laboratory Medicine: The Diagnosis of Disease in the Clinical Laboratory. (McGraw Hill, 2010). ISBN 978-1-260-11679-3.
