= Phylloquinone monooxygenase (2,3-epoxidizing) =

phylloquinone monooxygenase (2,3-epoxidizing)

Identifiers
- EC no.: 1.14.99.20
- CAS no.: 54596-37-1

Databases
- IntEnz: IntEnz view
- BRENDA: BRENDA entry
- ExPASy: NiceZyme view
- KEGG: KEGG entry
- MetaCyc: metabolic pathway
- PRIAM: profile
- PDB structures: RCSB PDB PDBe PDBsum
- Gene Ontology: AmiGO / QuickGO
Search
- PMC: articles
- PubMed: articles
- NCBI: proteins

In enzymology, a phylloquinone monooxygenase (2,3-epoxidizing) (EC 1.14.99.20) is an enzyme that catalyzes the chemical reaction

phylloquinone + AH_{2} + O_{2} $\rightleftharpoons$ 2,3-epoxyphylloquinone + A + H_{2}O

The three substrates of this enzyme are phylloquinone, an electron acceptor AH_{2}, and O_{2}, whereas its three products are 2,3-epoxyphylloquinone, the reduction product A, and H_{2}O.

This enzyme belongs to the family of oxidoreductases, specifically those acting on paired donors, with O_{2} as oxidant and incorporation or reduction of oxygen. The oxygen incorporated need not be derive from O miscellaneous. The systematic name of this enzyme class is phylloquinone,hydrogen-donor:oxygen oxidoreductase (2,3-epoxidizing). Other names in common use include phylloquinone epoxidase, vitamin K 2,3-epoxidase, vitamin K epoxidase, and vitamin K_{1} epoxidase.
