= Waldenström =

Waldenström is a surname. Notable people with the surname include:

- Paul Petter Waldenström (1838–1917), Swedish theologian who became the most prominent leader of the free church movement in late 19th century Sweden
- Jan G. Waldenström (1906–1996), Swedish physician who identified the condition known as Waldenström macroglobulinemia. Grand-nephew of Paul Petter Waldenström

== See also ==
- Waldenström hyperglobulinemic purpura
- Waldenström's macroglobulinemia
