= Peptidyl-glutamate 4-carboxylase =

Identifiers
- EC no.: 4.1.1.90

Databases
- IntEnz: IntEnz view
- BRENDA: BRENDA entry
- ExPASy: NiceZyme view
- KEGG: KEGG entry
- MetaCyc: metabolic pathway
- PRIAM: profile
- PDB structures: RCSB PDB PDBe PDBsum
Search
- PMC: articles
- PubMed: articles
- NCBI: proteins

Peptidyl-glutamate 4-carboxylase (EC 4.1.1.90, vitamin K-dependent carboxylase, gamma-glutamyl carboxylase) is an enzyme with systematic name peptidyl-glutamate 4-carboxylase (2-methyl-3-phytyl-1,4-naphthoquinone-epoxidizing). This enzyme catalyses the following chemical reaction

peptidyl-4-carboxyglutamate + 2,3-epoxyphylloquinone + H_{2}O $\rightleftharpoons$ peptidyl-glutamate + CO_{2} + O_{2} + phylloquinone

The enzyme can use various vitamin-K derivatives, including menaquinone.
