= Buttock cell =

Cell type found in certain cancers

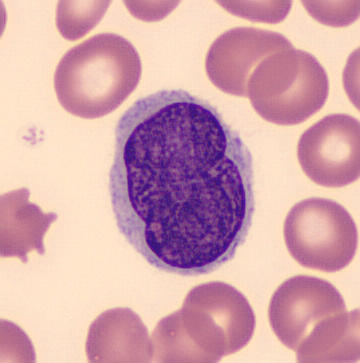
Buttock cell seen in Sézary syndrome (Peripheral blood - MGG stain)

Buttock cells are cells having a notched appearance that are found in certain malignancies, such as non-Hodgkin's lymphoma (including follicular lymphoma), mycosis fungoides, and Sézary syndrome.

== See also ==
- Clue cell
- Koilocyte
- Large cell
