= Large cell =

Term used in oncology

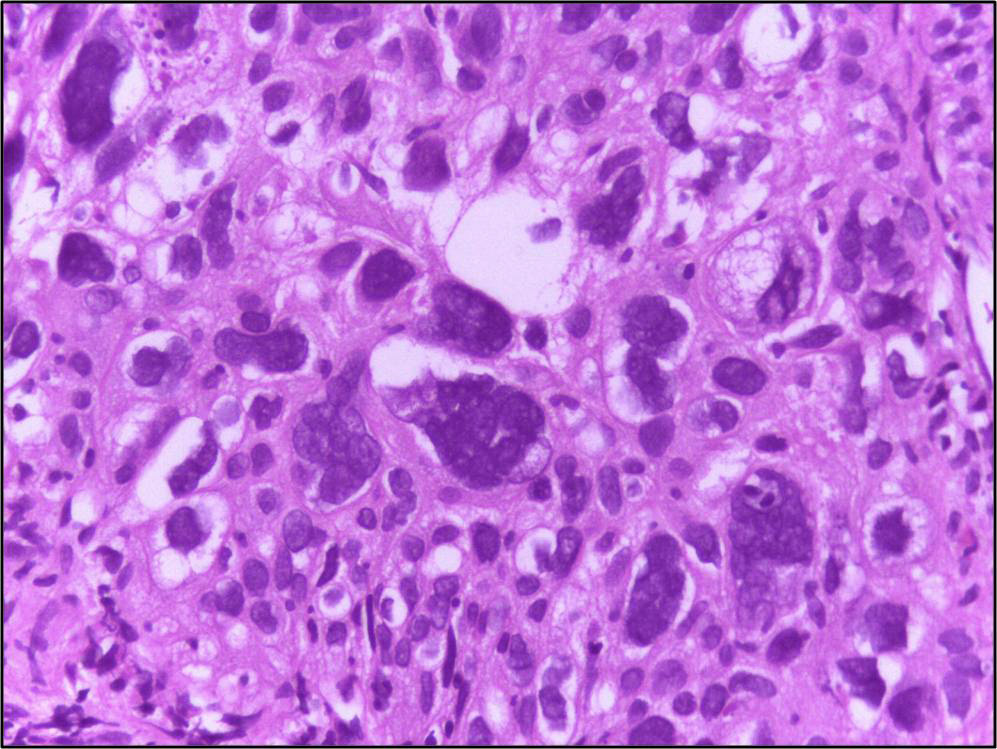
Micrograph showing large cells. H&E stain.

Large cell is a term used in oncology. It does not refer to a particular type of cell; rather it refers to cells that are larger than would be normally expected for that type. It is frequently used when describing lymphoma and lung cancer.

It was more frequently used in the past than it is used today, when doctors often could tell little about a cell other than its size, and it was used for classification systems such as the "Working Formulation" for lymphoma. As such, the term lives on in the names of many conditions, even when the size of the cell is no longer one of the most important diagnostic criteria.

The phrase giant cell is also frequently used, especially with carcinoma.

Giant cell tumors include giant-cell tumor of bone, giant-cell tumor of the tendon sheath, and giant cell fibroblastoma.

== See also ==
- Anaplastic large-cell lymphoma
- Buttock cell
- Massive giant-cell tumor of pelviacetabulum
- Nosology
