= Factor XII deficiency =

- Other names: Hageman factor deficiency
- Specialty: Hematology, medical genetics

Factor XII deficiency is a deficiency in the production of factor XII (FXII), a plasma glycoprotein and clotting factor that participates in the coagulation cascade and activates factor XI. FXII appears to be not essential for blood clotting, as individuals with this condition are usually asymptomatic and form blood clots in vivo. FXII deficiency tends to be identified during presurgical laboratory screening for bleeding disorders.

The condition can be inherited or acquired.

== Symptoms and signs ==
While it is indicated that people with FXII deficiency are generally asymptomatic, studies in women with recurrent miscarriages suggest an association with FXII deficiency. The condition is of importance in the differential diagnosis to other bleeding disorders, specifically the hemophilias: hemophilia A with a deficiency in factor VIII or antihemophilic globulin, hemophilia B with a deficiency in factor IX (Christmas disease), and hemophilia C with a deficiency in factor XI. Other rare forms of bleeding disorders are also in the differential diagnosis.

There is concern that individuals with FXII deficiency are more prone to thrombophilic disease, however, this is at variance with a long-term study from Switzerland.

== Causes ==
Inherited or congenital FXII deficiency is usually passed on by autosomal recessive inheritance. A person needs to inherit a defective gene from both parents. People who have only one defective gene are asymptomatic, but may have lower FXII levels and can pass the gene on to half their offspring.

In persons with congenital FXII deficiency the condition is lifelong. People affected may want to alert other family members as they may also carry the gene. A 1994 study of 300 healthy blood donors found that 7 persons (2.3%) had FXII deficiencies with one subject having no detectable FXII (0.3%). This study is at variance with estimates that only 1 in 1,000,000 people has the condition.

The acquired form of FXII deficiency is seen in patients with the nephrotic syndrome, liver disease, sepsis and shock, disseminated intravascular coagulation, and other diseases.

== Diagnosis ==
The condition is diagnosed by blood tests in the laboratory when it is noted that special blood clotting test are abnormal. Specifically Activated Partial Thromboplastin Time (aptt) is prolonged. The diagnosis is confirmed by an assay detecting very low or absent FXII levels.

The FXII (F12) gene is found on chromosome 5q33-qter. In hereditary angioedema type III an increased activity of factor XII has been described.

== Treatment ==
In congenital FXII deficiency treatment is not necessary. In acquired FXII deficiency the underlying problem needs to be addressed.

== History ==
The condition was first described in 1955 based by blood testing of a patient named John Hageman.
