= Antithrombin III deficiency =

- Other names: ATIII deficiency
- Specialty: Hematology

Antithrombin III deficiency (abbreviated ATIII deficiency) is a deficiency of antithrombin III. This deficiency may be inherited or acquired. It is a rare hereditary disorder that generally comes to light when a patient suffers recurrent venous thrombosis and pulmonary embolism, and repetitive intrauterine fetal death (IUFD). Hereditary antithrombin deficiency results in a state of increased coagulation which may lead to venous thrombosis. Inheritance is usually autosomal dominant, though a few recessive cases have been noted. The disorder was first described by Egeberg in 1965. The causes of acquired antithrombin deficiency are easier to find than the hereditary deficiency.

The prevalence of antithrombin deficiency is estimated at ~0.02 to 0.2% of the general population, and 1-5% of patients with venous thromboembolism. There is an elevated risk of thrombosis, whereby 50% patients with AT deficiency were found to have venous thromboembolism by age 50.

== Diagnosis ==
A clinical suspicion for antithrombin deficiency can be made in patients with: 1. recurrent venous thromboembolic disease, 2. childhood thrombosis, 3. thrombosis in pregnancy. Testing for antithrombin activity can confirm deficiency if the levels are less than 70%. Deficiency can result from genetic predisposition or from acquired causes such as: acute thrombosis, disseminated intravascular coagulopathy, liver disease, nephrotic syndrome, L-asparaginase, oral contraception, or estrogens. Genetic testing for abnormalities of the SERPINC1 gene can be done to evaluate further.

== Management ==
In patients with antithrombin deficiency, they may develop resistance to unfractionated heparin, especially with continuous infusions. If large quantities of unfractionated heparin are required e.g. greater than 35000 units per day, this would point towards resistance. Antithrombin concentrates have been used, though with risk of bleeding at large doses of unfractionated heparin. Low molecular weight heparin at full weight based dosing is effective; however, measurements of peak anti-Xa levels may not reflect anticoagulant effect. Vitamin K antagonists, and direct oral anticoagulants, including anti-Xa inhibitors and thrombin inhibitors have also been used, though data is limited.

== See also ==
- Antithrombin
