= Musculin =

Protein-coding gene in the species Homo sapiens

MSC

Identifiers
- Aliases: MSC, ABF-1, ABF1, MYOR, bHLHa22, musculin
- External IDs: OMIM: 603628; MGI: 1333884; GeneCards: MSC

Gene location (Human)
Chr.	Chromosome 8 (human)
Band	8q13.3	Start	71,841,560 bp
Band	8q13.3	End	71,844,412 bp

Gene location (Mouse)
Chr.	Chromosome 1 (mouse)
Band	1 A3|1 4.5 cM	Start	14,823,570 bp
Band	1 A3|1 4.5 cM	End	14,826,216 bp
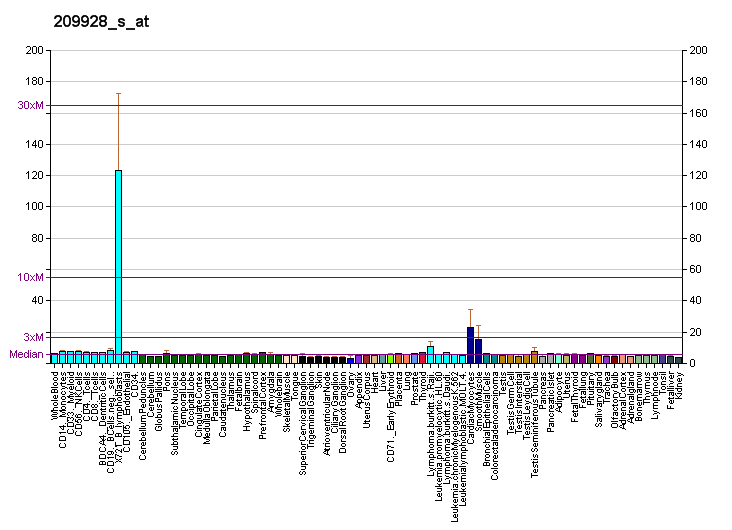
RNA expression pattern
Bgee	Human / Mouse (ortholog); Top expressed in: right coronary artery; left coronary artery; thoracic aorta; ascending aorta; Descending thoracic aorta; testicle; stromal cell of endometrium; gallbladder; apex of heart; tibial arteries / Top expressed in: mesenteric lymph nodes; morula; blastocyst; internal carotid artery; embryo; embryo; thymus; optic nerve; Gonadal ridge; spleen; More reference expression data
BioGPS	More reference expression data
Gene ontology
Molecular function	DNA-binding transcription factor activity; RNA polymerase II cis-regulatory region sequence-specific DNA binding; DNA binding; DNA-binding transcription repressor activity, RNA polymerase II-specific; protein dimerization activity; transcription corepressor activity; DNA-binding transcription factor activity, RNA polymerase II-specific
Cellular component	nucleus; nucleoplasm
Biological process	roof of mouth development; regulation of transcription, DNA-templated; negative regulation of transcription by RNA polymerase II; transcription by RNA polymerase II; branchiomeric skeletal muscle development; transcription, DNA-templated; diaphragm development; cellular response to leukemia inhibitory factor
Sources:Amigo / QuickGO
Orthologs
Databases	NCBI: entry; OMA: entry
Species	Human	Mouse
Entrez	9242	17681
Ensembl	ENSG00000178860	ENSMUSG00000025930
UniProt	O60682	O88940
RefSeq (mRNA)	NM_005098	NM_010827; NM_001360810
RefSeq (protein)	NP_005089	NP_034957; NP_001347739
Location (UCSC)	Chr 8: 71.84 – 71.84 Mb	Chr 1: 14.82 – 14.83 Mb
PubMed search
- Wikidata
View/Edit Human	View/Edit Mouse

Musculin is a protein that in humans is encoded by the MSC gene.

The protein encoded by this gene is a transcriptional repressor capable of binding an E-box element either as a homodimer or as a heterodimer with E2A in vitro. The encoded protein also forms heterodimers with E2A proteins in vivo. This protein is capable of inhibiting the transactivation capability of E47, an E2A protein, in mammalian cells. This gene is a downstream target of the B-cell receptor signal transduction pathway.
