= Lymphatic disease =

- Specialty: Lymphologist

Lymphatic disease is a class of disorders which directly affect the components of the lymphatic system.

Examples include Castleman's disease and lymphedema.

== Types ==
Diseases and disorder

Hodgkin's Disease/Hodgkin's Lymphoma Hodgkin lymphoma This is a type of cancer of the lymphatic system. It can start almost anywhere in the body. It is believed to be caused by HIV, Epstein-Barr Syndrome, age, and family history. Symptoms include weight gain, fever, swollen lymph nodes, night sweats, itchy skin, fatigue, chest pain, coughing, or trouble swallowing.

Non-Hodgkin's Lymphoma

Lymphoma is usually malignant cancer. It is caused by the body producing too many abnormal white blood cells. It is not the same as Hodgkin's Disease. Symptoms usually include painless, enlarged lymph node or nodes in the neck, weakness, fever, weight loss, and anemia.

Lymphadenitis

Lymphadenitis is an infection of the lymph nodes usually caused by a virus, bacteria or fungi. Symptoms include redness or swelling around the lymph node.

Lymphangitis

Lymphangitis is an inflammation of the lymph vessels. Symptoms usually include swelling, redness, warmth, pain or red streaking around the affected area.

Lymphedema

Lymphedema is the chronic pooling of lymph fluid in the tissue. Lymphedema can start anywhere in the lymphatic system of the body. It's also a side-effect of some surgical procedures. Kathy Bates is an advocate and supporter for further research for lymphedema.

Lymphocytosis

Lymphocytosis is a high lymphocyte count. It can be caused by an infection, blood cancer, lymphoma, or autoimmune disorders that are accompanied by chronic swelling.
