= DUSP22 =

Protein-coding gene in the species Homo sapiens

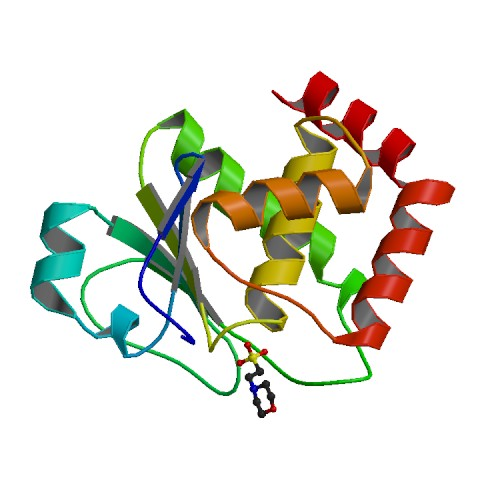

Identifiers
- Aliases: DUSP22, JKAP, JSP-1, JSP1, LMW-DSP2, LMWDSP2, MKP-x, MKPX, VHX, dual specificity phosphatase 22
- External IDs: OMIM: 616778; MGI: 1915926; GeneCards: DUSP22
Available structures
PDB	Ortholog search: PDBe RCSB
PDB	List of PDB id codes 1WRM, 4WOH
Enzyme activity
EC #	BRENDA	ExPASy	KEGG	MetaCyc
3.1.3.16	↗	↗	↗	↗
3.1.3.48	↗	↗	↗	↗

Gene location (Human)
Chr.	Chromosome 6 (human)
Band	6p25.3	Start	291,630 bp
Band	6p25.3	End	351,355 bp

Gene location (Mouse)
Chr.	Chromosome 13 (mouse)
Band	13|13 A3.2	Start	30,843,982 bp
Band	13|13 A3.2	End	30,895,214 bp
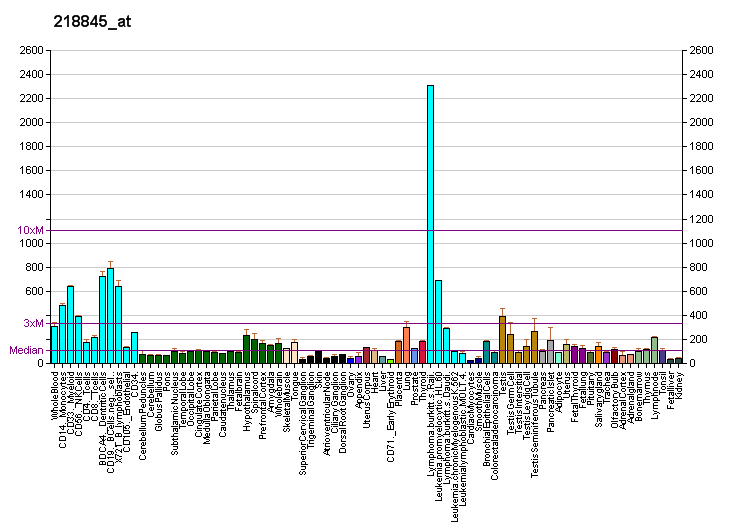
RNA expression pattern
Bgee	Human / Mouse (ortholog); Top expressed in: secondary oocyte; gingival epithelium; hair follicle; visceral pleura; monocyte; gonad; parietal pleura; Brodmann area 23; tibia; endothelial cell / Top expressed in: lip; esophagus; spermatid; skin of external ear; digastric muscle; cumulus cell; cornea; skeletal muscle tissue; thoracic diaphragm; extraocular muscle; More reference expression data
BioGPS	More reference expression data
Gene ontology
Molecular function	protein tyrosine phosphatase activity; phosphatase activity; phosphoprotein phosphatase activity; hydrolase activity; protein tyrosine/serine/threonine phosphatase activity; non-membrane spanning protein tyrosine phosphatase activity; protein tyrosine kinase binding
Cellular component	cytoplasm; nucleus; cytosol; plasma membrane; filamentous actin; leading edge of lamellipodium
Biological process	multicellular organism development; negative regulation of T cell mediated immunity; protein dephosphorylation; peptidyl-tyrosine dephosphorylation; cell population proliferation; negative regulation of T cell activation; negative regulation of transcription by RNA polymerase II; transforming growth factor beta receptor signaling pathway; regulation of cell population proliferation; positive regulation of JNK cascade; negative regulation of T cell receptor signaling pathway; dephosphorylation; apoptotic process; negative regulation of cell migration; negative regulation of focal adhesion assembly; cellular response to epidermal growth factor stimulus; negative regulation of non-membrane spanning protein tyrosine kinase activity
Sources:Amigo / QuickGO
Orthologs
Databases	NCBI: entry; OMA: entry
Species	Human	Mouse
Entrez	56940	105352
Ensembl	ENSG00000112679	ENSMUSG00000069255
UniProt	Q9NRW4	Q99N11
RefSeq (mRNA)	NM_001286555; NM_020185	NM_001037955; NM_134068
RefSeq (protein)	NP_001273484; NP_064570	NP_001033044; NP_598829
Location (UCSC)	Chr 6: 0.29 – 0.35 Mb	Chr 13: 30.84 – 30.9 Mb
PubMed search
- Wikidata
View/Edit Human	View/Edit Mouse

Dual specificity protein phosphatase 22 is an enzyme that in humans is encoded by the DUSP22 gene.
