= Paroxysmal hemoglobinuria =

Paroxysmal hemoglobinuria can refer to:

- Paroxysmal nocturnal hemoglobinuria
- Paroxysmal cold hemoglobinuria

== See also ==
- Hemoglobinuria
