= Platelet storage pool deficiency =

- Other names: Storage pool platelet disease
- Platelet storage pool deficiency is inherited in an autosomal dominant manner
- Specialty: Hematology
- Symptoms: Anemia
- Causes: Inherited or acquired
- Diagnostic method: Flow cytometry, Bleeding time analysis
- Treatment: Antifibrinolytic medications

Platelet storage pool deficiency is a family of clotting disorders characterized by deficient granules in platelets. Individuals with these disorders have too few or abnormally functioning alpha granules, delta granules, or both alpha and delta granules and are therefore unable to form effective clots, which leads to prolonged bleeding. Platelet storage pool deficiency can be acquired or inherited.

== Symptoms and signs ==
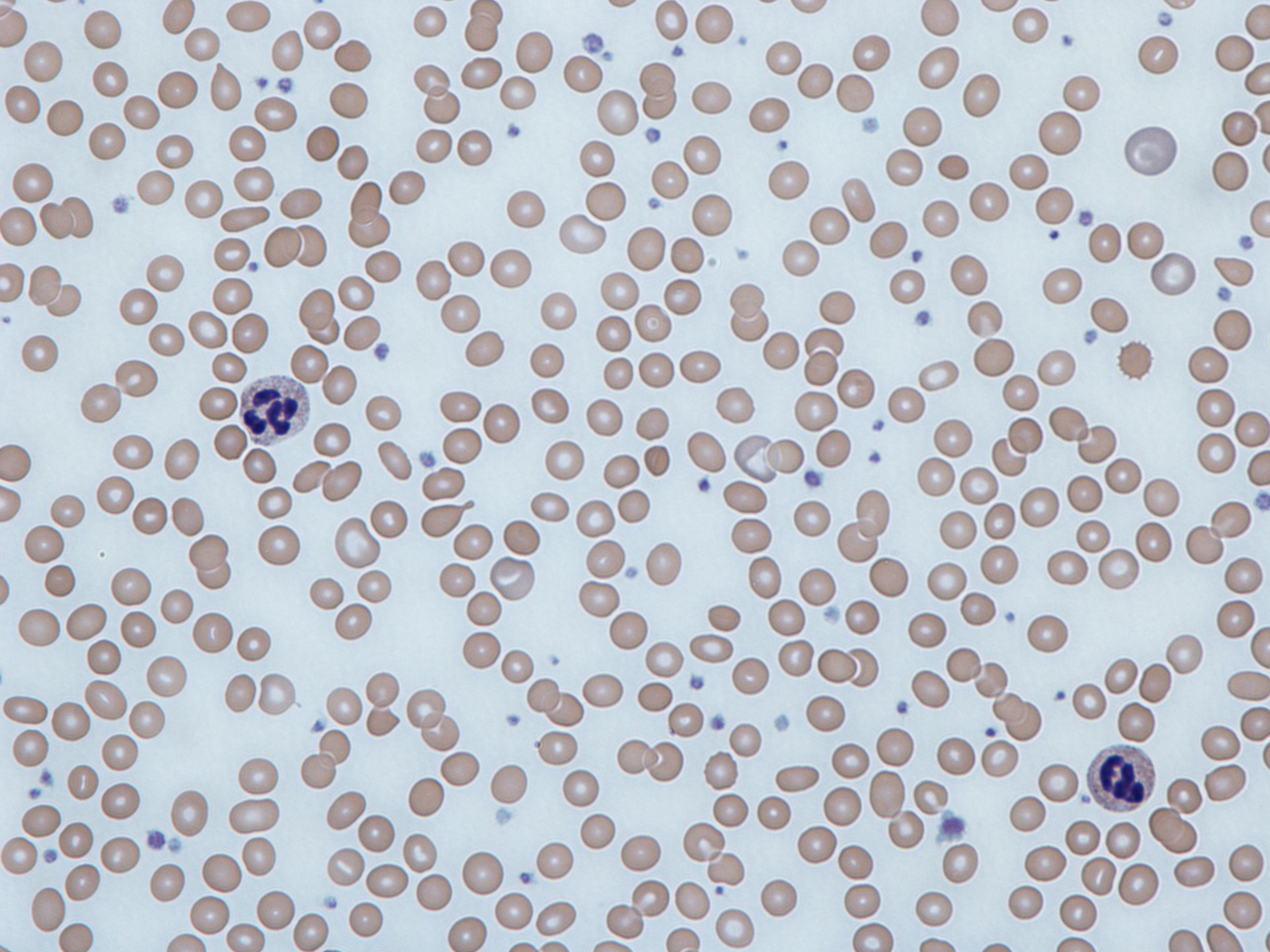
Anemia

The symptoms individuals with platelet storage pool deficiency may experience include the following:

- Easy bruising
- Nose bleeds
- Bleeding from gums
- Heavy or prolonged menstrual bleeding (menorrhagia) or bleeding after childbirth
- Abnormal bleeding after surgery, circumcision, or dental work

Severity can vary widely from person to person, and individuals with platelet storage pool deficiency may not experience all of the above symptoms.

== Cause ==
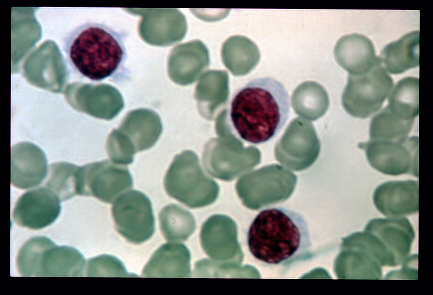
Hairy cell leukemia

Platelet storage pool deficiency can be acquired or inherited. Inheritance may be autosomal dominant or autosomal recessive, depending on the specific disorder.

Some of the causes of platelet storage pool deficiency when acquired are:

- Hairy-cell leukemia
- Cardiovascular bypass

== Mechanism ==
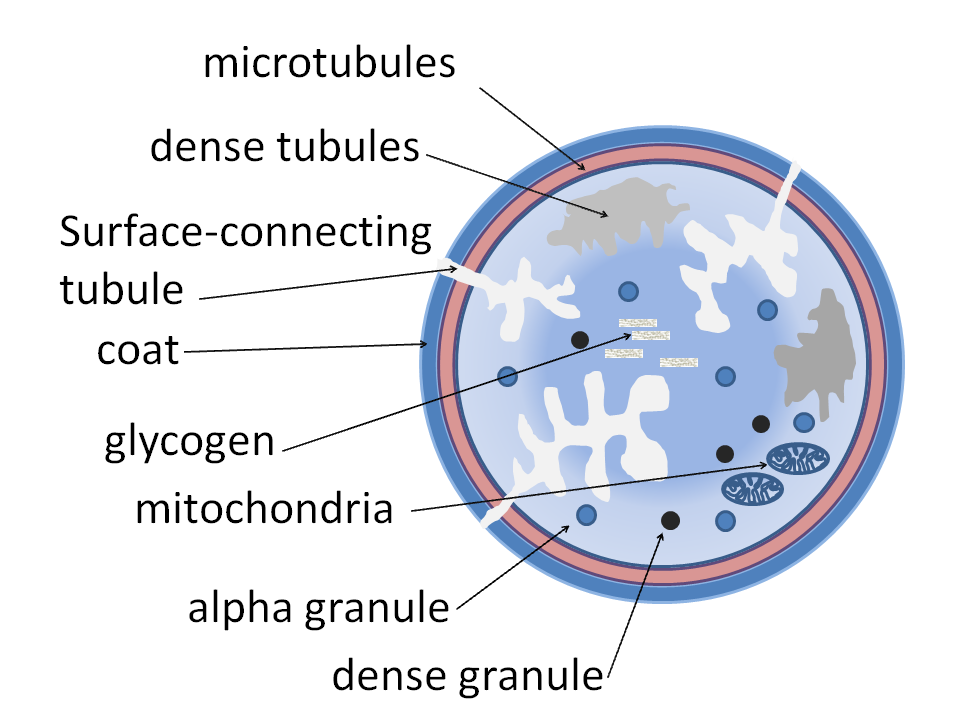
Platelet structure

In terms of the pathophysiology of platelet storage pool deficiency one must consider several factors including the human body's normal function prior to such a deficiency, such as platelet alpha-granules one of three types of platelet secretory granule.

Platelet α–granules are important in platelet activity. α–granules connect with plasma membrane. This in turn increases the size of the platelet. Platelet α–granules have an important role in hemostasis as well as thrombosis. SNARE accessory proteins control the secretion of α–granule.

== Diagnosis ==
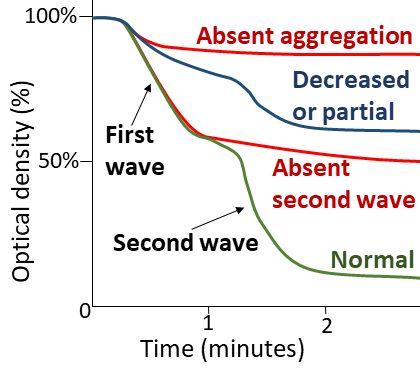
On for example optical densitometry, a first and second wave of platelet aggregation is seen, in this case for an ADP-initiated aggregation. The second wave is absent in platelet storage pool deficiency.

The diagnosis of this condition can be done via the following:

- Flow cytometry
- Bleeding time analysis
- Platelet aggregation function study:

Platelet aggregation function by disorders and agonists
	ADP	Epinephrine	Collagen	Ristocetin
P2Y receptor defect (including Clopidogrel)	Decreased	Normal	Normal	Normal
Adrenergic receptor defect	Normal	Decreased	Normal	Normal
Collagen receptor defect	Normal	Normal	Decreased or absent	Normal
Von Willebrand disease (except Type 2B); Bernard–Soulier syndrome	Normal	Normal	Normal	Decreased or absent
Glanzmann's thrombasthenia; Afibrinogenemia	Decreased	Decreased	Decreased	Normal or decreased
Storage pool deficiency	Absent second wave			Partial
Aspirin or aspirin-like disorder	Absent second wave		Absent	Normal

=== Types ===
This condition may involve the alpha granules or the dense granules. Some common inherited disorders associated with each include the following:

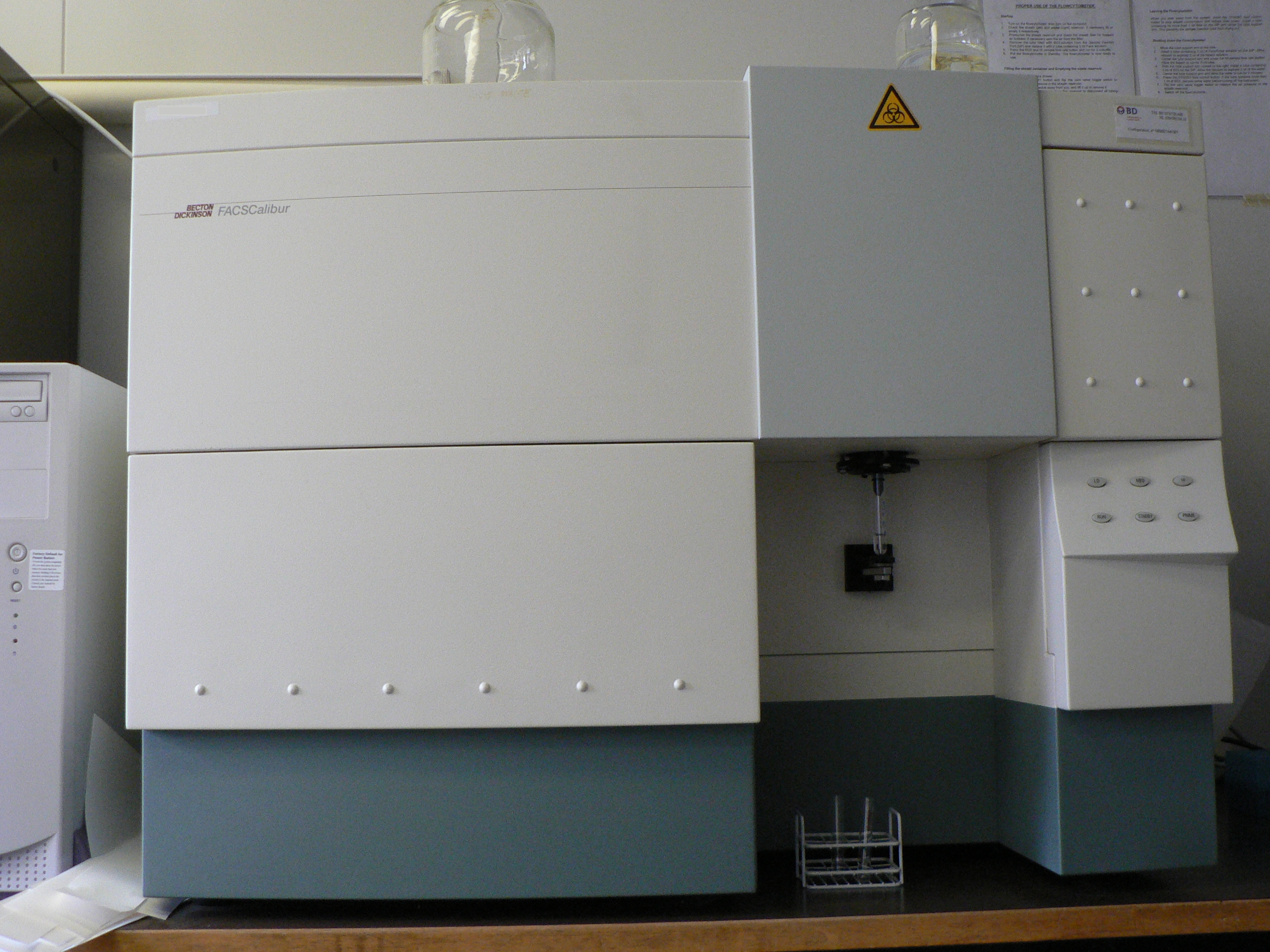
Flow cytometry analysis

- Platelet alpha-granules
  - Gray platelet syndrome
  - Quebec platelet disorder
- Dense granules
  - δ-Storage pool deficiency
  - Hermansky–Pudlak syndrome
  - Chédiak–Higashi syndrome

== Treatment ==
Platelet storage pool deficiency usually requires no daily treatment, although many individuals with heavy menstrual bleeding take hormonal contraceptives to reduce menstrual symptoms. However, management of uncontrolled bleeding consists of antifibrinolytic medications or transfusion of normal blood products. Additionally, caution should be taken with usage of NSAIDS, since they thin the blood and further impair clotting.

== See also ==
- Hypocoagulability
- Hypercoagulability
