= Adrenocortical hyperfunction =

- Specialty: Endocrinology

Adrenocortical hyperfunction is a condition where there is an overexpression of products of the adrenal cortex.
