= Massive giant-cell tumor of pelviacetabulum =

Giant-cell tumor (GCT) of the pelvis is uncommon, accounting for only 1.5 to 6% of cases of GCT. In pelvis ilium is the most common site of involvement; ischium and pubis are less frequently involved. It typically presents in adults between age of 20 to 50 with localized swelling and pain. Females are slightly more affected than males.

Average size of the tumor in this region is 9.5 cm.

There are different modalities of treatment of pelvic GCT. Radiotherapy has high rate of recurrence (44%) and risk of soft tissue sarcomas (12%). Thus treatment should be essentially surgical which includes surgical excision. Excision can be extralesional which achieves 90% local tumor control but poor functional outcome or it can be intralesional which has 90% local recurrence rate with good functional outcome.

Massive GCT of pelvis, which is static, not amenable to excision and presenting with mechanical symptoms, can be managed by de-bulking the portion of tumor responsible for mechanical symptoms. And patients need to be followed for local invasion or metastasis.
