= Small cleaved cells =

Cell type found in lymphomas

Small cleaved cells are a distinctive type of cell that appears in certain types of lymphoma.

When used to uniquely identify a type of lymphoma, they are usually categorized as follicular (C82.0) or diffuse (C83.1) .

The "small cleaved cells" are usually centrocytes that express B-cell markers such as CD20. The disease is strongly correlated with the genetic translocation t(14;18), which results in juxtaposition of the bcl-2 proto-oncogene with the heavy chain JH locus, and thus in overexpression of bcl-2. Bcl-2 is a well known anti-apoptotic gene, and thus its overexpression results in the "failure to die" motif of cancer seen in follicular lymphoma.

Follicular lymphoma must be carefully monitored, as it often progresses into a more aggressive "Diffuse Large B-Cell Lymphoma."
