= Phagocyte bactericidal dysfunction =

- Specialty: Immunology, hematology

Phagocyte bactericidal dysfunction refers to a class of medical conditions where phagocytes have a diminished ability to fight bacterial infection.

Examples include:

- Hyperimmunoglobulin E syndrome
- Chédiak–Higashi syndrome
- Chronic granulomatous disease
