= Vitamin K deficiency =

- Specialty: Endocrinology
- Symptoms: bruising, petechiae, hematomas, oozing of blood at surgical or puncture sites, stomach pains, cartilage calcification, and severe malformation of developing bone or deposition of insoluble calcium salts in the walls of arteries.
- Causes: insufficient dietary vitamin K_{1} or vitamin K_{2} or both
- Medication: phytonadione

Vitamin K deficiency results from insufficient dietary vitamin K_{1} or vitamin K_{2} or both.

== Signs and symptoms ==
Symptoms include bruising, petechiae, and hematomas.

Vitamin K is changed to its active form in the liver by the enzyme vitamin K epoxide reductase. Activated vitamin K is then used to gamma carboxylate (and thus activate) certain enzymes involved in coagulation: Factors II, VII, IX, X, and protein C and protein S. The inability to activate the clotting cascade via these factors leads to the bleeding symptoms mentioned above.

Notably, when one examines the lab values in vitamin K deficiency [see below] the prothrombin time is elevated, but the partial thromboplastin time is normal or only mildly prolonged. The deficiency leads to decreased activity in the intrinsic pathway (F-IX) factors, monitored by PTT, and the extrinsic pathway (F-VII) which PT monitors. However, factor VII has the shortest half-life of all the factors carboxylated by vitamin K; therefore, when deficient, it is the PT that rises first, since the activated Factor VII is the first to "disappear." In later stages of deficiency, the other factors (which have longer half-lives) can "catch up," and the PTT also rises.

== Cause ==
Vitamin K_{1}-deficiency may occur by disturbed intestinal uptake (such as would occur in a bile duct obstruction), by therapeutic or accidental intake of a vitamin K_{1}-antagonist such as warfarin, or, very rarely, by nutritional vitamin K_{1} deficiency. As a result, Gla-residues are inadequately formed and the Gla-proteins are insufficiently active.

== Epidemiology ==
The prevalence of vitamin K deficiency varies by geographic region. For infants in the United States, vitamin K_{1} deficiency without bleeding may occur in as many as 50% of infants younger than 5 days old, with the classic hemorrhagic disease occurring in 0.25-1.7% of infants. Therefore, the Committee on Nutrition of the American Academy of Pediatrics recommends that 0.5 to 1.0 mg vitamin K_{1} be administered to all newborns shortly after birth.

Postmenopausal and elderly women in Thailand have a high risk of vitamin K_{2} deficiency, compared with the normal value of young, reproductive females. Current dosage recommendations for vitamin K may be too low. The deposition of calcium in soft tissues, including arterial walls, is quite common, especially in those who have atherosclerosis, suggesting that vitamin K deficiency is more common than previously thought.

Because colonic bacteria synthesize a significant portion of the vitamin K required for human needs, individuals with disruptions to or insufficient amounts of these bacteria can be at risk for vitamin K deficiency. As mentioned above, newborns fit into this category, as their colons are frequently not adequately colonized in the first five to seven days of life. Another at-risk population comprises those individuals on any long-term antibiotic therapy, as this can diminish the population of normal gut flora.

== See also ==
- Haemorrhagic disease of the newborn
