= Waldenström hyperglobulinemic purpura =

- Other names: Purpura hyperglobulinemica
- Specialty: Dermatology

Waldenström hyperglobulinemic purpura is a skin condition that presents with episodic showers of petechiae (small red or purple spots) occurring on all parts of the body, most profusely on the lower extremities.

== See also ==
- Skin lesion
