= Heavy chain disease =

- Specialty: Immunology, hematology

Heavy chain disease is a form of paraproteinemia and plasma cell dyscrasia that involves the proliferation of cells producing immunoglobulin heavy chains.

This disease is characterized by an excessive production of heavy chains that are short and truncated. These heavy chain disease proteins have various deletions, mainly in their amino-terminal part, which causes the heavy chains to lose the ability to form disulfide bonds with the light chains. The defect in the immunoglobulins presumably arises during somatic hypermutation. Deletion of the N-terminal part of the heavy chain disease protein leads to aggregation and signaling of the B cell receptor, presumably due to the loss of the anti-aggregating properties of the light chain.

== Classification ==
There are four forms:

- alpha chain disease (Seligmann's disease)
- gamma chain disease (Franklin's disease)
- mu chain disease
- delta chain disease

=== IgA/αHCD ===
The most common type of heavy chain disease is the IgA type, known as αHCD. The most common type of αHCD is the gastrointestinal form (known as immunoproliferative small intestine disease or IPSID), but it has also been reported in the respiratory tract, and other areas of the body.

=== IgG/γHCD ===
Franklin's disease (gamma heavy chain disease) It is a very rare B-cell lymphoplasma cell proliferative disorder which may be associated with autoimmune diseases and infection is a common characteristic of the disease. It is characterized by lymphadenopathy, fever, anemia, malaise, hepatosplenomegaly, and weakness. The most distinctive symptom is palatal edema, caused by nodal involvement of Waldeyer's ring. Diagnosis is made by the demonstration of an anomalous serum M component that reacts with anti-IgG but not anti-light chain reagents. Bone marrow examination is usually nondiagnostic. Patients usually have a rapid downhill course and die of infection if left untreated or misdiagnosed.

Patients with Franklin disease usually have a history of progressive weakness, fatigue, intermittent fever, night sweats and weight loss and may present with lymphadenopathy (62%), splenomegaly (52%) or hepatomegaly (37%). The fever is considered secondary to impaired cellular and humoral immunity, and thus recurrent infections are the common clinical presentation in Franklin disease. Weng et al. described the first case of Penicillium sp. infection in a patient with Franklin disease and emphasized the importance of proper preparation for biopsy, complete hematologic investigation, culture preparation and early antifungal coverage to improve the outcome.

The γHCD can be divided into three categories based on the various clinical and pathological features. These categories are disseminated lymphoproliferative disease, localized proliferative disease and no apparent proliferative disease.

- Disseminated lymphoproliferative disease is found in 57–66% of patients diagnosed with γHCD. Lymphadenopathy and constitutional symptoms are the usual features.
- Localized proliferative disease is found in approximately 25% of γHCD patients. This is characterized by a localization of the mutated heavy chains in extramedullary tissue, or solely in the bone marrow.
- No apparent proliferative disease is seen in 9–17% of patients with γHCD, and there is almost always an underlying autoimmune disorder.

=== IgM/μHCD ===
The IgM type of heavy chain disease, μHCD, is often misdiagnosed as chronic lymphoid leukemia (CLL) because the two diseases are often associated with each other and show similar symptoms.
