= Lupus vasculitis =

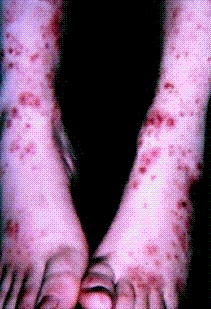
- Cutaneous small-vessel vasculitis. Bilateral palpable purpura and necrotic lesions
- Specialty: Rheumatology

Lupus vasculitis is one of the secondary vasculitides that occurs in approximately 50% of patients with systemic lupus erythematosus (SLE).

Large vessel involvement is extremely uncommon; medium-sized vessels can also be impacted, but small vessels are the most frequently linked to it. Lupus vasculitis can affect multiple organ systems and show up as a wide range of clinical manifestations depending on the location and size of the affected vessels.

Lupus vasculitis typically indicates a dismal prognosis, so early diagnosis is essential to a successful outcome. The disease can affect small vessels or a single organ, and it can range in severity from a relatively mild condition to a multiorgan system disease with potentially fatal symptoms, like mesenteric vasculitis, pulmonary hemorrhage, or mononeuritis multiplex.

The organs affected and the severity of the vasculitis process determine the course of treatment.

== Signs and symptoms ==
Cutaneous vasculitis is the most common type of vasulitis amongst those with systemic lupus erythematosus. The clinical presentation is variable and can include superficial ulcerations, splinter hemorrhages, panniculitis, macules, erythema with necrosis or erythematous plaques, cutaneous infarction, livedo reticularis, bullous lesions of the extremities or urticaria lesions, papulonodular lesions, petechiae, and palpable purpura. The majority of skin lesions are composed of nodular lesions, erythema of the hand dorsum, and discoid erythematosus lesions, which are typically found on the fingertips. Most of the time, small vessels—primarily post-capillary venules—are involved. Less commonly, medium-vessel vasculitis manifests as ischemic ulcers or subcutaneous nodules.

Patients with SLE may experience peripheral and central nervous system vasculitis. The most prevalent clinical manifestation at the peripheral level is mononeuritis multiplex. Rather than affecting many nerves diffusely, it affects a single nerve focally or multifocally. Clinical manifestations consist of peripheral neuropathy affecting at least two distinct nerve areas that is asymmetrical, progressive, and asynchronous, as well as weakness, pain, and sensory loss. Contiguous nerves are affected as the disease progresses, resulting in a syndrome that resembles a generalized polyneuropathy. Patients with SLE may also develop a mild-to-moderately-severe peripheral symmetric sensory polyneuropathy. At the central level, the most commonly reported clinical features that may manifest concurrently or independently during the course of the disease are seizure disorders, cerebrovascular disease, demyelinating syndrome, and cognitive dysfunction.

Lupus enteritis, or SLE-related vasculitis of the gastrointestinal tract, is a rare condition; the estimated prevalence of SLE patients is 9.7%. Lupus mesenteric vasculitis is a common manifestation of gastrointestinal vasculitis in SLE. One of the most deadly consequences of SLE is lupus mesenteric vasculitis, which has a 50% death rate when severe, occlusive damage leads to bowel ischemia and possible small- or large-bowel necrosis, which can then develop into perforation and bleeding. The main symptoms are bloating, diarrhea, vomiting, nausea, hematemesis, melena, and acute abdominal pain. Urinary symptoms such as dysuria and lupus cystitis may be associated with lupus mesenteric vasculitis in about 22.7% of cases.

The least common renal vascular injury associated with lupus nephritis is true renal vasculitis, which has not been widely documented in the literature. It was discovered after the fact in renal biopsies in 2.8%, 2.4%, and 0.6% of cases. Although the clinical manifestations of various vascular lesions differ, SLE patients with renal vasculitis typically exhibit anemia, glomerular lesions, hematuria, hypertension that often worsens the vascular changes, high SLEDAI scores, and severe renal insufficiently with rapid progression to renal failure.

Rarely is retinal vasculitis reported as a complication in case reports. Usually, involvement occurs in the precapillary superficial arterial vasculature. Retinal vasculitis may manifest as asymptomatic or with decreased vision, painless blurred vision or permanent vision loss.

Few case reports of coronary vasculitis have been documented in the literature, making it an uncommon illness. It frequently shows up in the absence of laboratory evidence of active SLE and clinical SLE flare. There have also been isolated reports of myocardial dysfunction brought on by small vessel vasculitis and cardiac valve malfunction.

Diffuse alveolar hemorrhage, which results from red blood cells entering the alveolar spaces as a result of extensive pulmonary vessel damage and disruption of the alveolar-capillary basement membrane, is the most frequent clinical manifestation of lupus pulmonary vasculitis. In more than 60% of cases, symptoms can include fever, chest pain, hemoptysis, coughing, and progressive and severe dyspnea. It's possible for some patients to have no symptoms.

== Causes ==
Lupus vasculitis is a secondary vasculitis that may manifest in the form of acute or subacute lupus symptoms as a result of an inflammatory process caused by immune complex deposition within blood vessel walls. On the other hand, it might manifest as comorbidity linked to steroids (steroid-related atherosclerosis) or as the combined pathogenetic effect of heightened atherosclerosis in a proinflammatory milieu.

== Mechanism ==
The development of lupus vasculitis is not fully understood. It involves complex interactions between an aggressive immune response against the body's own cells, inflammatory changes, and blood vessels. Immune complexes (made up of antibodies that mistakenly attack self-proteins) get deposited in blood vessel walls, which triggers an inflammatory response that damages these blood vessels over time. Injury to blood vessels can cause the vessel wall to thicken which prevents adequate blood flow to organs, or to weaken which leads to bleeding into the surrounding tissues.

Various autoantibodies have been identified in the development of lupus vasculitis including anti-endothelial cell antibodies (AECA), anti-neutrophil cytoplasmic antibodies (ANCA), anti-phospholipid antibody (aPL), and anti-double stranded DNA (anti-dsDNA). Other processes that may contribute to the progression of vasculitis include changes in cell death signaling and impaired clearance of dying cells.

Other forms of vasculitis in SLE patients can be caused by drugs or infections. In drug-induced lupus vasculitis, the drug molecule forms a hapten that triggers an intense immune response within the vasculature. Some of these drugs include penicillin, thiazides, monoclonal antibodies, and carbamazepine. Infection-induced lupus vasculitis involves the direct attack of pathogens on vessel walls with subsequent immune complex deposition, inflammation, and injury to blood vessels.

== Diagnosis ==
Skin biopsies from individuals who had lupus cutaneous vasculitis showed secondary changes to the overlying epidermis and sweat glands, variable fibrinoid necrosis of the vessel walls, and fragmented neutrophilic nuclei (a leukocytoclastic variant).

Nervous system vasculitis affecting the peripheral nervous system is histologically characterized by chronic axonal degeneration, necrotizing, or occlusive vasculitis of the vasa nervorum, and demyelination. For clinicians, diagnosing central nervous vasculitis can be difficult. The gold standard for the diagnosis is a brain biopsy, but because the vascular lesions are segmental in nature, this is a highly invasive procedure with limited sensitivity. Without a brain biopsy, an early diagnosis can frequently be made using a combination of neuroimaging, clinical features, and relevant diagnostic investigations.

Computed tomography (CT), which visualizes the abdominal vasculature as well as the colon wall, is the gold standard for diagnosing gastrointestinal vasculitis. Bowel wall edema, target signs, intestinal segment dilatation, increased attenuation of mesenteric fat, prominent mesenteric vessels, and ascites are typical tomographic findings.

Fluorescein angiography and optical coherence tomography are two types of retinal imaging that can be useful in diagnosing and characterizing retinal vasculitis.

Serial coronary angiographic studies that reveal arterial aneurysms, tapered stenoses, and/or rapidly forming arterial occlusions are typically used to diagnose coronary vasculitis.

== Treatment ==
The European League Against Rheumatism's (EULAR) updated recommendations for SLE serve as a clinical benchmark, but the course of treatment for lupus vasculitis should be determined by the severity of the condition and its accompanying symptoms. Typically, oral corticosteroids and immunosuppressants like mycophenolate mofetil, azathioprine, and methotrexate are used to treat mild-to-moderate symptoms. For the severe and potentially fatal forms, a more aggressive course of treatment including intravenous high-dose corticosteroids, rituximab, cyclophosphamide, intravenous immunoglobulin, and/or plasmapheresis is taken into consideration.

Several serious complications of lupus vasculitis that require immediate and aggressive treatment include the GI tract (mesenteric vasculitis with bowel ischemia), nervous system (seizures, transverse myelitis, multiple mononeuropathy), or lungs (diffuse alveolar hemorrhage). Currently, there lacks clinical trials specific for the treatment of lupus vasculitis. Due to this limitation, therapy recommendations are often made based on treatment for other autoimmune disease or vasculitis syndromes.

Milder symptoms are commonly treated with oral corticosteroids and immunosuppressants such as methotrexate or azathioprine. Severe cases require more aggressive therapy with high-dose intravenous corticosteroids, monoclonal antibodies, cyclophosphamide, intravenous immunoglobulin (IVIG), or plasmapheresis. For skin involvement, some reported therapies include hydroxychloroquine, colchicine, mycophenolate mofetil, or rituximab.

== See also ==
- Lupus
- Vasculitis
