= Golfer's vasculitis =

Skin condition

- Other names: Exercise-induced vasculitis, Disney rash, hiker's rash.
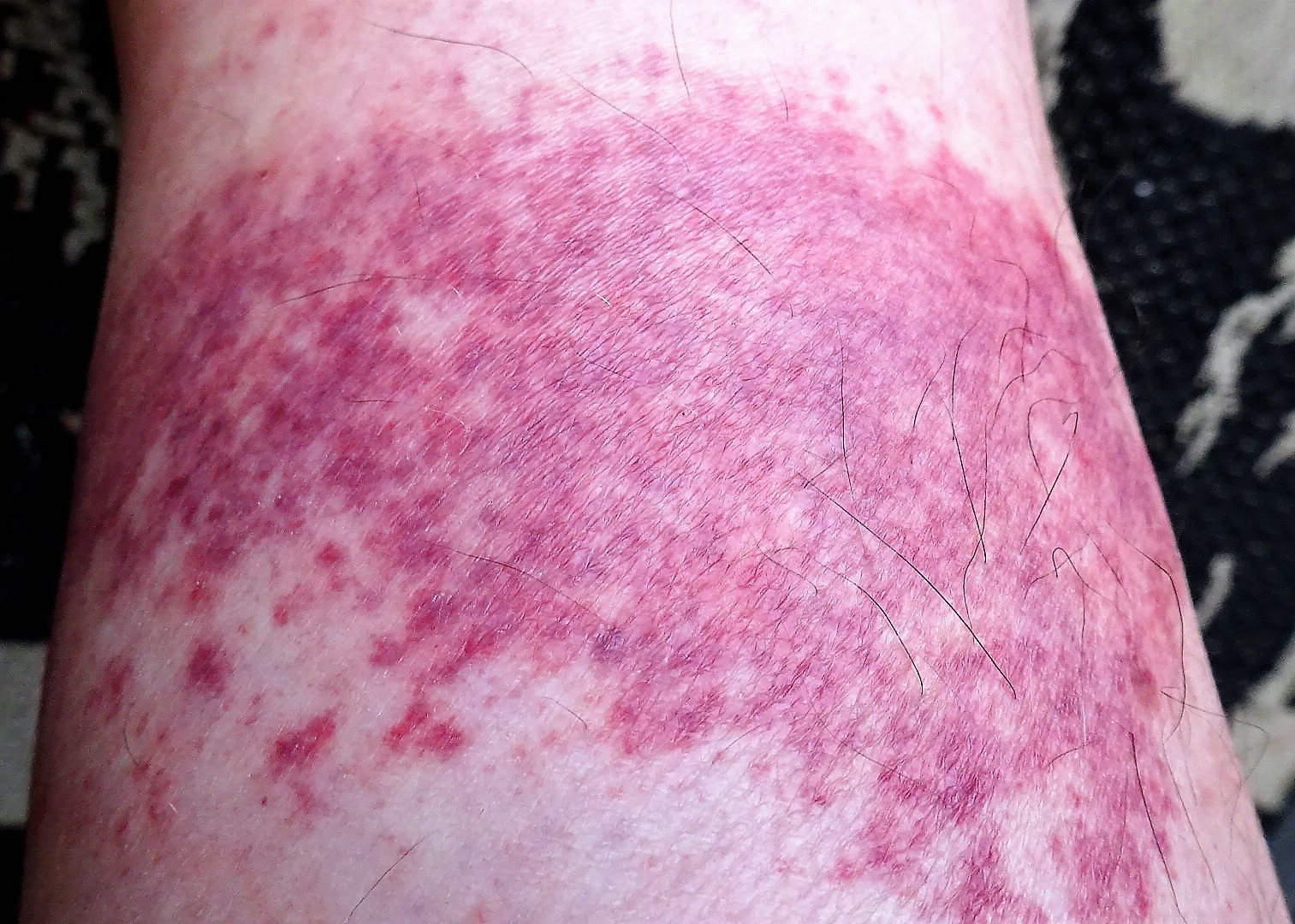
- Cutaneous vasculitis, ankle area; also called golfer's rash
- Specialty: Dermatology
- Symptoms: Red or purple-colored spots Swelling (edema) in affected areas Itching, pain Stinging
- Duration: 3 to 14 days
- Causes: Strenuous exercise or activity, especially in warm weather

Golfer's vasculitis, also called exercise-induced vasculitis, sport-induced vasculitis, Disney rash, or hiker's rash, is a form of small blood vessel inflammation resulting in a rash. It occurs in the lower legs, and is caused by excessive walking in hot temperatures. It is more common in elderly or obese people.

It is called golfer's vasculitis due to the walking involved in playing golf – a sport commonly practiced by older people. Disney rash became a name because the rash is common among visitors walking at Disney theme parks.

Golfer's vasculitis is not contagious and typically disappears within 2 weeks.

== Development and stages ==
The development of golfer's vasculitis typically follows a predictable pattern in several stages:

- Triggering events: The condition is typically triggered by prolonged periods of walking or standing, especially in hot and humid conditions. Activities such as golfing, sightseeing, or attending outdoor events are common precipitating factors. The combination of heat, exercise, and gravity (due to prolonged standing) may have a role in the onset of the conditions.
- Initial onset: Symptoms usually begin to develop several hours after the triggering activity; the first noticeable sign is often feeling a warmth or slight discomfort in the lower legs.
- Rash development: Within 24–28 hours after the triggering event, the characteristic rash becomes apparent. The rash typically starts as small, reddish-purple spots or patches on the lower legs. As the condition progresses, the spots may coalesce into larger, more confluent areas of discoloration.
- Peak symptoms: The rash usually reaches its peak intensity within 3–4 days after onset. Associated symptoms, such as itching, burning sensation, and mild swelling, are often most pronounced during this stage.
- Resolution phase: In most cases, the rash and associated symptoms begin to subside after 3–4 days without specific treatment. The discoloration gradually fades, and any swelling or discomfort diminishes. Complete resolution typically occurs within 7–10 days, although in some cases it may take up to 2–3 weeks.
- Post-inflammatory changes: In some individuals, particularly those with darker skin tones or after repeated episodes, temporary hyperpigmentation may persist for several weeks after the rash has resolved. This pigmentation change is usually not permanent and fades over time.
- Recurrence: Golfer's vasculitis tends to recur when individuals are exposed to similar triggering conditions. Some people may experience multiple episodes during hot seasons or vacations involving prolonged walking. With repeated episodes, some individuals may develop the rash more quickly or with less intense triggering factors.

The severity and duration of each stage can vary among individuals, and not everyone will experience all stages in the same way.

== Signs and symptoms ==
Common signs and symptoms of golfer's vasculitis include a purple-red rash, welting of the skin, and generalized swelling, typically occurring in the legs above the socks. Symptoms may or may not include a burning sensation, itching or pain.

Characteristic signs and symptoms include:

- Skin rash: The most prominent feature is a reddish-purple rash that appears on the lower legs, typically below the knees and above the ankles. The rash is often described as blotchy, mottled, or net-like (reticular in appearance). In some cases, the rash may extend to the dorsum of the feet.
- Distribution: The rash is usually bilateral and symmetrical, affecting both legs equally. It tends to spare areas covered by socks or shoes.
- Itching: Many patients report mild to moderate itching (pruritus) in the affected areas. The intensity of itching can vary among individuals.
- Swelling: Some individuals may experience slight swelling (edema) in the lower legs alongside the rash. This swelling is typically mild and localized to the affected areas.
- Burning sensation: A burning or stinging sensation in the affected skin is commonly reported. This discomfort can range from mild to moderate in intensity.
- Pain: While not as common as itching or burning, some patients may experience mild pain or tenderness in the affected areas.
- Timing of onset: Symptoms typically appear after prolonged periods of walking or standing, especially in hot weather conditions. The rash often becomes noticeable several hours after the triggering activity.
- Duration: The rash and associated symptoms usually resolve on their own within 3–10 days without specific treatment. However, in some cases, it may persist for up to 2–3 weeks.
- Recurrence: Symptoms tend to recur when similar conditions (prolonged walking or standing in hot weather) are repeated. Some individuals may experience multiple episodes during hot seasons.
- Absence of systemic symptoms: Golfer's vasculitis is not associated with fever, joint pain, or other systemic symptoms that are common in other forms of vasculitis. The condition remains localized to the skin.
- Skin temperature: The affected areas may feel warm to the touch due to the inflammatory process.
- Pigmentation changes: In some cases, particularly in individuals with darker skin tones or after repeated episodes, the affected areas may show temporary hyperpigmentation (darkening of the skin).

Although these signs and symptoms are characteristic of golfer's vasculitis, they can vary in severity among individuals.

== Risk factors and demographics ==
Golfer's vasculitis is commonly associated with warm weather and prolonged physical activity involving high impact or weight-bearing, which is why it is also sometimes known as "exercise-induced vasculitis", "exercise-induced purpura" or "golfer's purpura". Although golfer's vasculitis is also known by many names such as "hiker's vasculitis" or "Disney rash", cases of golfer's vasculitis have also been associated with cycling, dancing, swimming, or even outdoor cleaning. It can occur in both legs.

The mechanism by which this condition develops is unclear. Preliminary research suggests that the pathophysiology of the condition is likely a combination of many risk factors related to unusual and prolonged exercise in hot, humid weather; this can lead to spikes in heat in tissue due to both the environment and energy release in muscles, and pooling of blood in the legs with prolonged upright posture. Remaining in an upright position for prolonged periods in warm environments, which occurs in golfers, can lead to local capillary inflammation.

This condition has rarely been documented in children or adolescents, and affects primarily older people. Other studies have also shown that this condition may affect women more than men, as women may experience swelling due to fluid retention in the legs, feet or abdomen after being stationary. The proposed mechanism includes the possibility that increased leg fat may impair the ability to dissipate heat. Only 8-10% of patients had recurrent vasculitis.

In preliminary research, about 88% of subjects developed a rash after playing golf, while the others were engaging in various forms of physical activity, such as skiing, standing for prolonged periods of time, tennis or running. The report stated that most of the cases occurred in men over age 50, and there was a tendency for the rash to develop in summer compared to winter.

== Prevention ==
Golfer's vasculitis is a benign, self-limiting skin condition that typically resolves within several days. Avoiding extended periods of exercise in warm weather is preventative. Therapy with nonsteroidal anti-inflammatory drugs may help reduce pain and inflammation. In addition, those affected may find relief through leg elevation and avoidance of standing.

== Diagnosis ==
Golfer's vasculitis occurs from inflammation of the skin blood vessels. There are different clinical manifestations of vasculitis based on the vessel size affected, such as small arteries, arterioles and capillaries. Golfer's vasculitis is a commonly misdiagnosed condition due to its rarity in otherwise healthy people.

Laboratory tests may be unremarkable for electrolytes and creatinine levels, liver function, and complement levels. Golfer's vasculitis may present signs similar to those of cutaneous leukocytoclasic angiitis.

Biopsies may be used to confirm the presence of golfer's vasculitis based on histological features, imaging, or clinical presentations. A biopsy may reveal red blood cells leaking from the vessels and endothelial cell swelling. Golfer's vasculitis is a form of cutaneous vasculitis which manifests in palpable purpura or infiltrated erythema. In a case-control study of exercise-induced vasculitis in hikers, a biopsy showed that leukocytoclastic vasculitis was present.

Direct immunofluorescence can be used to detect exercise-induced vasculitis, which may present with neutrophil deposits in small blood vessels as confirmed by histology.

== Treatment ==
Treatment of golfer's vasculitis includes avoiding triggers, such as excessive standing. Treatment of symptoms like itching, burning, and inflammation may include non-steroidal anti-inflammatory agents, antihistamines, or aspirin. However, most cases of golfer's vasculitis resolve on their own over about 3 to 4 days without any intervention.

For mild recurrent or persistent vasculitis, colchicine or dapsone are first-choice therapies. Other first-line choices for therapy may include oral glucocorticoids, especially if the vasculitis is severe and painful.
