= Vasculitis =

Medical disorders that destroy blood vessels by inflammation

- Other names: Vasculitides
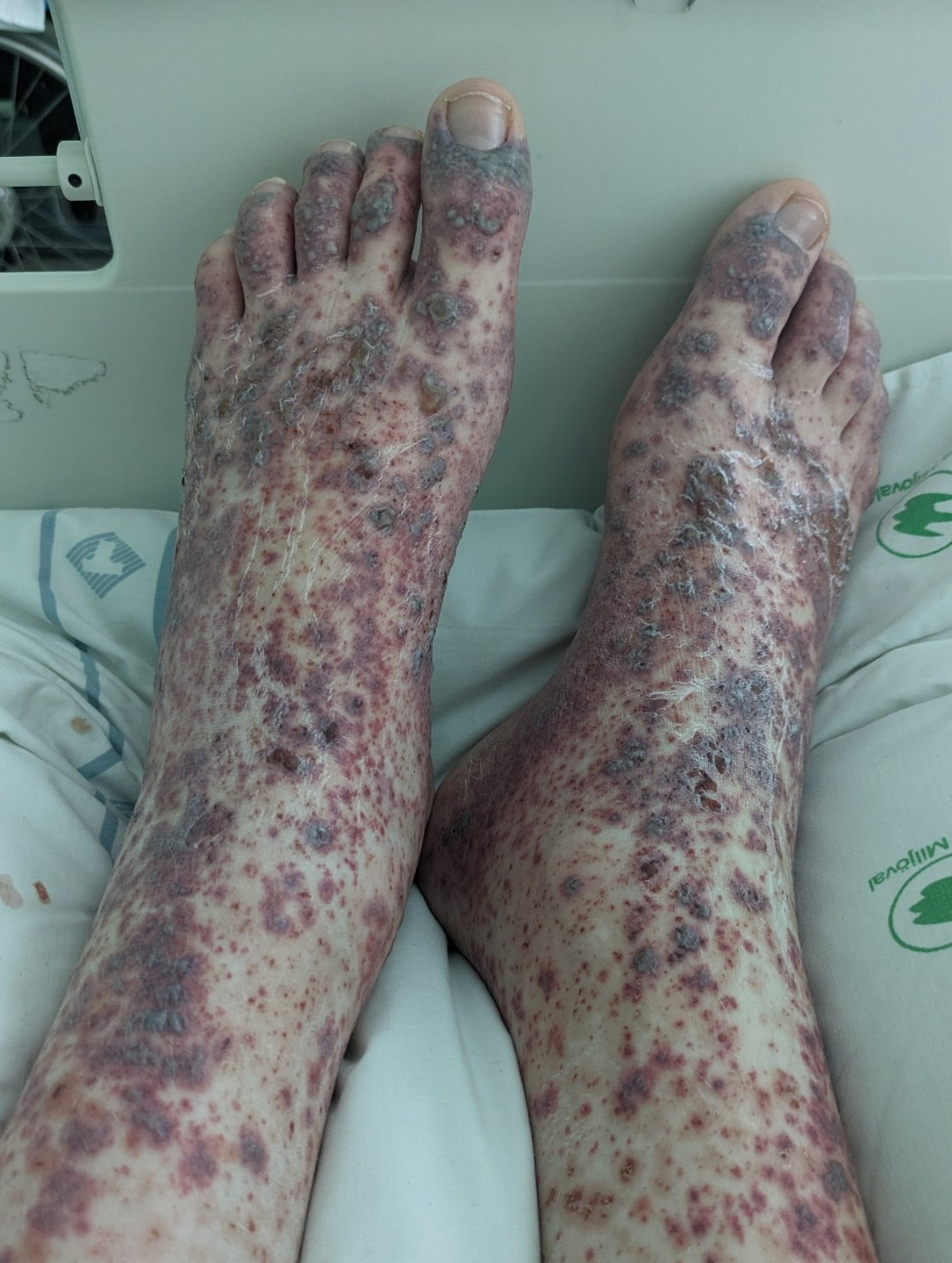
- Petechia and purpura on the lower limb due to infection-associated vasculitis.
- Pronunciation: /væskjʊˈlaɪtɪs/
- Specialty: Rheumatology, Immunology
- Symptoms: Weight loss, fever, myalgia, purpura, abdominal pain
- Complications: Gangrene, Myocardial infarction
- Frequency: 0.005%

Vasculitis is a group of disorders that destroy blood vessels by inflammation. Both arteries and veins are affected. Lymphangitis (inflammation of lymphatic vessels) is sometimes considered a type of vasculitis. Vasculitis is primarily caused by leukocyte migration and resultant damage. Although both occur in vasculitides, inflammation of veins (phlebitis) or arteries (arteritis) on their own are separate entities.

== Signs and symptoms ==
The clinical presentation of the various vasculitides on the skin and internal organs is mostly determined by the diameter or size of the vessels mainly affected. Non-specific symptoms are common and include fever, headache, fatigue, myalgia, weight loss, and arthralgia.

All forms of vasculitides, even large vessel vasculitides, may cause skin manifestations. The most common skin manifestations include purpura, nodules, livedo reticularis, skin ulcers, and purpuric urticaria.

Type	Name	Main symptoms
Primary large vessel vasculitis	Takayasu arteritis	Diminished or absent pulses, vascular bruits, hypertension, Takayasu retinopathy, and aortic regurgitation.
Primary large vessel vasculitis	Giant cell arteritis	Headache, scalp tenderness, jaw claudication, and blindness.
Primary medium vessel vasculitis	Polyarteritis nodosa	Mononeuritis multiplex, nodules, purpura, livedo, and hypertension.
Primary medium vessel vasculitis	Kawasaki disease	Fever, conjunctivitis, exanthema, palmoplantar erythema, cervical lymphadenopathy, and mucosal enanthema.
Primary small vessel antineutrophil cytoplasmic antibody (ANCA)–associated vasculitis	Microscopic polyangiitis	Focal segmental rapidly progressive glomerulonephritis, proteinuria, hemoptysis, palpable purpura, abdominal pain, and peripheral neuropathy.
Primary small vessel antineutrophil cytoplasmic antibody (ANCA)–associated vasculitis	Granulomatosis with polyangiitis	Crusting rhinorrhea, sinusitis, chronic otitis media, nasal obstruction, shortness of breath, and chronic cough.
Primary small vessel antineutrophil cytoplasmic antibody (ANCA)–associated vasculitis	Eosinophilic granulomatosis with polyangiitis	Asthma, allergic rhinitis, sinusitis, nasal polyps, peripheral neuropathy, pulmonary infiltrates, and abdominal pain.
Primary immune complex small vessel vasculitis	Anti-glomerular basement membrane disease	Glomerulonephritis, lung hemorrhage, hematuria, hemoptysis, cough, and dyspnea.
Primary immune complex small vessel vasculitis	Cryoglobulinemic vasculitis	Palpable purpura, Raynaud's phenomenon, joint pain, and peripheral neuropathy.
Primary immune complex small vessel vasculitis	IgA vasculitis	Palpable purpura, arthralgia, abdominal pain, nephritis, and haematuria.
Primary immune complex small vessel vasculitis	Hypocomplementemic urticarial vasculitis	Hives, arthralgia, membranoproliferative glomerulonephritis, and chronic obstructive pulmonary disease.
Primary variable vessel vasculitis	Behçet's disease	Oral ulcers, genital ulcers, papulopustular lesions, uveitis, superficial venous thrombosis and deep vein thrombosis.
Primary variable vessel vasculitis	Cogan syndrome	Interstitial keratitis, ocular redness, vertigo, and tinnitus.
Single-organ vasculitis	Cutaneous small-vessel vasculitis	Palpable purpura, necrosis, ulceration, bullae, and nodules.
Single-organ vasculitis	Cutaneous arteritis	Nodules, livedo reticularis, ulcers, and gangrene.
Single-organ vasculitis	Primary central nervous system vasculitis	Headache, cognitive impairment, stroke, encephalopathy, and seizures.
Single-organ vasculitis	Retinal vasculitis	Visual impairments, floaters, and macular edema.
Secondary vasculitis	Lupus vasculitis	Palpable purpura, petechiae, papulonodular lesions, urticaria lesions, and mononeuritis multiplex.
Secondary vasculitis	Rheumatoid vasculitis	Purpura, focal digital lesions, ulcers, digital necrosis, pyoderma, distal sensory or motor neuropathy, and mononeuritis multiplex.

== Causes ==
There are several different etiologies for vasculitides. Although infections usually involve vessels as a component of more extensive tissue damage, they can also directly or indirectly cause vasculitic syndromes through immune-mediated secondary events. Simple vascular thrombosis usually only affects the luminal process, but through the process of thrombus organization, it can also occasionally cause a more chronic vasculitic syndrome. The autoimmune etiologies, a particular family of diseases characterized by dysregulated immune responses that produce particular pathophysiologic signs and symptoms, are more prevalent.

== Classification ==
Primary systemic, secondary, and single-organ vasculitides are distinguished using the highest classification level in the 2012 Chapel Hill Consensus Conference nomenclature.

=== Primary systemic vasculitis ===
Primary systemic vasculitis is categorized by the size of the vessels mainly involved. Primary systemic vasculitis includes large-vessel vasculitis, medium-vessel vasculitides, small-vessel vasculitides, and variable-vessel vasculitides.

==== Large vessel vasculitis ====
The 2012 Chapel Hill Consensus Conference defines large vessel vasculitis (LVV) as a type of vasculitis that can affect any size artery. It usually affects the aorta and its major branches more frequently than other vasculitides. Takayasu arteritis (TA) and giant cell arteritis (GCA) are the two main forms of LVV.

==== Medium vessel vasculitis ====
Medium vessel vasculitis (MVV) is a type of vasculitis that mostly affects the medium arteries, which are the major arteries that supply the viscera and their branches. Any size artery could be impacted, though. The two primary types are polyarteritis nodosa (PAN) and Kawasaki disease (KD).

==== Small vessel vasculitis ====
Small vessel vasculitis (SVV) is separated into immune complex SVV and antineutrophil cytoplasmic antibody (ANCA)-associated vasculitis (AAV).

Antineutrophil cytoplasmic antibody (ANCA)-associated vasculitis (AAV) is a necrotizing vasculitis linked to MPO-ANCA or PR3-ANCA that primarily affects small vessels and has few or no immune deposits. AAV is further classified as eosinophilic granulomatosis with polyangiitis (EGPA), granulomatosis with polyangiitis (GPA), and microscopic polyangiitis (MPA).

Immune complex small vessel vasculitis (SVV) is a vasculitis that primarily affects small vessels and has moderate to significant immunoglobulin and complement component deposits on the vessel wall. Normocomplementemic urticarial vasculitis (HUV) (anti-C1q vasculitis), cryoglobulinemic vasculitis (CV), IgA vasculitis (Henoch–Schönlein) (IgAV), and anti-glomerular basement membrane (anti-GBM) disease are the categories of immune complex SVV.

==== Variable vessel vasculitis ====
Variable vessel vasculitis (VVV) is a kind of vasculitis that may impact vessels of all sizes (small, medium, and large) and any type (arteries, veins, and capillaries), with no particular type of vessel being predominantly affected. This category includes Behcet's disease (BD) and Cogan's syndrome (CS).

=== Secondary vasculitis ===
The subset of illnesses known as secondary vasculitides is believed to be triggered by an underlying ailment or exposure. Systemic illnesses (such as rheumatoid arthritis), cancer, drug exposure, and infection are the primary causes of vasculitis; however, there are still a few factors that have a conclusively shown pathogenic relationship to the condition. Vasculitis frequently coexists with infections, and several infections, including hepatitis B and C, HIV, infective endocarditis, and tuberculosis, are significant secondary causes of vasculitis. Except for rheumatoid vasculitis, the majority of secondary vasculitis forms are exceedingly rare.

=== Single-organ vasculitis ===
Single-organ vasculitis, formerly known as "localized", "limited", "isolated", or "nonsystemic" vasculitis, refers to vasculitis that is limited to one organ or organ system. Examples of this type of vasculitis include gastrointestinal, cutaneous, and peripheral nerve vasculitides.

== Diagnosis ==
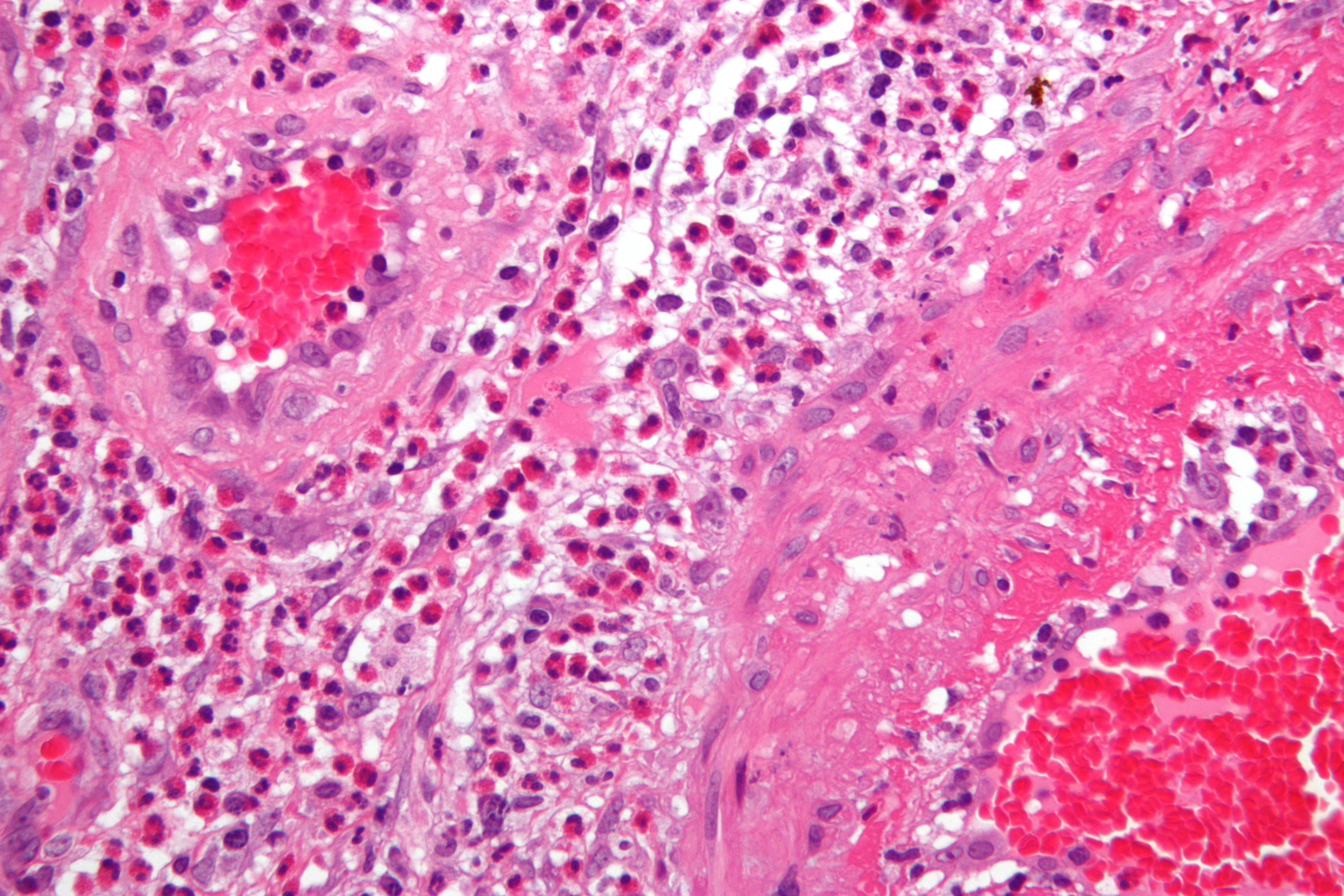
Micrograph showing a vasculitis (eosinophilic granulomatosis with polyangiitis). H&E stain.

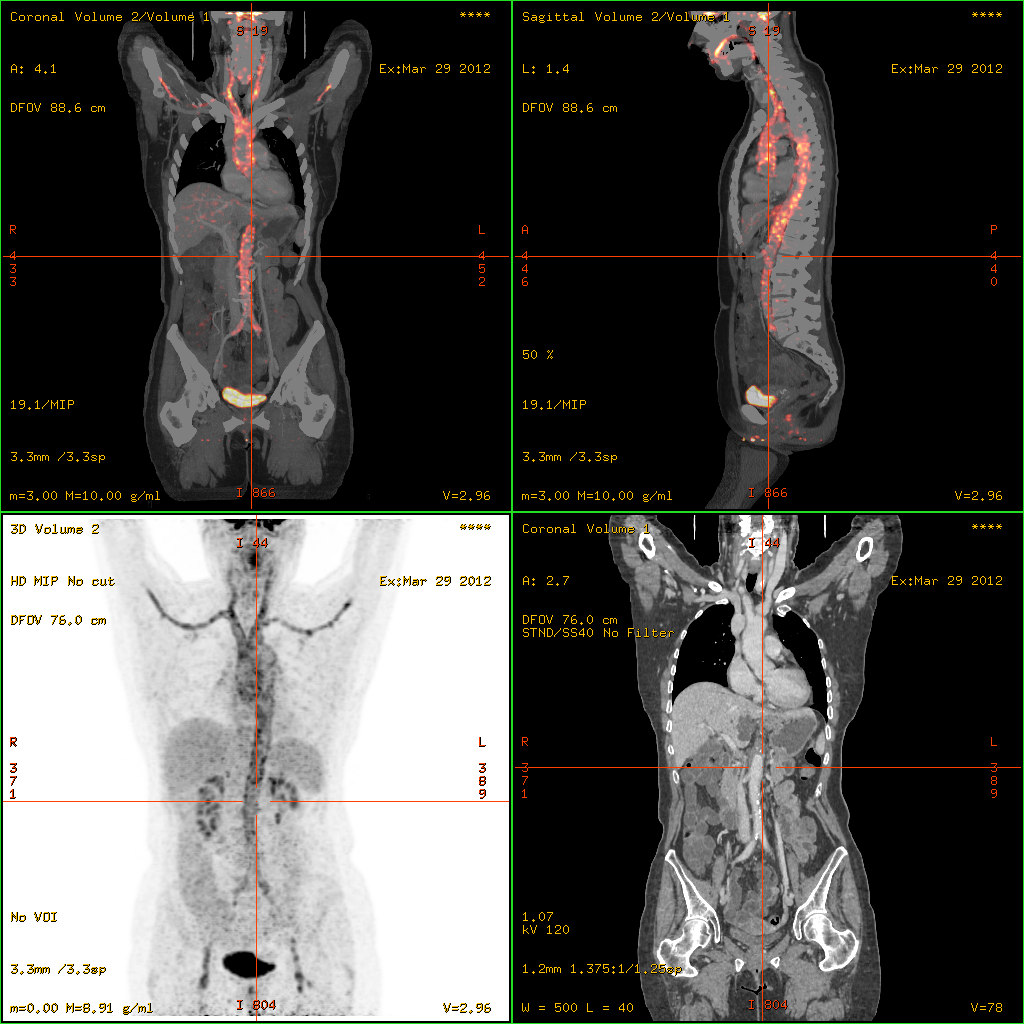
Severe vasculitis of the major vessels, displayed on FDG-PET/CT

- Laboratory tests of blood or body fluids are performed for patients with active vasculitis. Their results will generally show signs of inflammation in the body, such as increased erythrocyte sedimentation rate (ESR), elevated C-reactive protein (CRP), anemia, increased white blood cell count and eosinophilia. Other possible findings are elevated antineutrophil cytoplasmic antibody (ANCA) levels and hematuria.
- Other organ functional tests may be abnormal. Specific abnormalities depend on the degree of organ involvement. A brain SPECT can show decreased blood flow to the brain and brain damage.
- The definite diagnosis of vasculitis is established after a biopsy of involved organ or tissue, such as skin, sinuses, lung, nerve, brain, and kidney. The biopsy elucidates the pattern of blood vessel inflammation.

- Some types of vasculitides display leukocytoclasis, which is vascular damage caused by nuclear debris from infiltrating neutrophils. It typically presents as palpable purpura. Conditions with leucocytoclasis mainly include hypersensitivity vasculitis (also called leukocytoclastic vasculitis) and cutaneous small-vessel vasculitis (also called cutaneous leukocytoclastic angiitis).

- An alternative to biopsy can be an angiogram (x-ray test of the blood vessels). It can demonstrate characteristic patterns of inflammation in affected blood vessels.
- 18F-fluorodeoxyglucose positron emission tomography/computed tomography (FDG-PET/CT)has become a widely used imaging tool in patients with suspected Large Vessel Vasculitis, due to the enhanced glucose metabolism of inflamed vessel walls. The combined evaluation of the intensity and the extension of FDG vessel uptake at diagnosis can predict the clinical course of the disease, separating patients with favourable or complicated progress.
- Acute onset of vasculitis-like symptoms in small children or babies may instead be the life-threatening purpura fulminans, usually associated with severe infection.

Laboratory Investigation of Vasculitic Syndromes
Disease	Serologic test	Antigen	Associated laboratory features
Systemic lupus erythematosus	ANA including antibodies to dsDNA and ENA [including SM, Ro (SSA), La (SSB), and RNP]	Nuclear antigens	Leukopenia, thrombocytopenia, Coombs' test, complement activation: low serum concentrations of C3 and C4, positive immunofluorescence using Crithidia luciliae as substrate, antiphospholipid antibodies (i.e. anticardiolipin, lupus anticoagulant, false-positive VDRL)
Goodpasture's disease	Anti-glomerular basement membrane antibody	Epitope on noncollagen domain of type IV collagen	
Small vessel vasculitis			
Microscopic polyangiitis	Perinuclear antineutrophil cytoplasmic antibody	Myeloperoxidase	Elevated CRP
Granulomatosis with polyangiitis	Cytoplasmic antineutrophil cytoplasmic antibody	Proteinase 3 (PR3)	Elevated CRP
Eosinophilic granulomatosis with polyangiitis	perinuclear antineutrophil cytoplasmic antibody in some cases	Myeloperoxidase	Elevated CRP and eosinophilia
IgA vasculitis (Henoch–Schönlein purpura)	None		
Cryoglobulinemia			Cryoglobulins, rheumatoid factor, complement components, hepatitis C
Medium vessel vasculitis			
Classical polyarteritis nodosa	None		Elevated CRP and eosinophilia
Kawasaki's Disease	None		Elevated CRP and ESR

Neutrophil margination towards the edges of a capillary, a mimicker but not actual vasculitis.

In this table: ANA = antinuclear antibodies, CRP = C-reactive protein, ESR = erythrocyte sedimentation rate, dsDNA = double-stranded DNA, ENA = extractable nuclear antigens, RNP = ribonucleoproteins; VDRL = Venereal Disease Research Laboratory

== Treatment ==
Treatments are generally directed toward stopping the inflammation and suppressing the immune system. Typically, corticosteroids such as prednisone are used. Additionally, other immune suppression medications, such as cyclophosphamide, are considered. In case of an infection, antimicrobial agents including cephalexin may be prescribed. Affected organs (such as the heart or lungs) may require specific medical treatment intended to improve their function during the active phase of the disease.

== See also ==
- Golfer's vasculitis
