= Acute hemorrhagic edema of infancy =

Benign skin lesions present on infants

- Other names: Acute hemorrhagic oedema of infancy, acute hemorrhagic edema of childhood, Finkelstein's disease, infantile postinfectious iris-like purpura and edema, medallion-like purpura, purpura en cocarde avec œdème and Seidlmayer syndrome.
- Purpura is one of the main characteristics of Acute hemorrhagic edema of infancy.
- Specialty: Dermatology
- Symptoms: Purpura, edema, and fever
- Usual onset: 4 months and 2 years of age.
- Duration: 1–3 weeks.
- Differential diagnosis: Henoch–Schönlein purpura

Acute hemorrhagic edema of infancy (AHEI) is a type of leukocytoclastic vasculitis that is not fatal. Although it causes fever, large palpable purpuric skin lesions, and edema, it is a harmless condition. AHEI's appearance is frequently similar to that of Henoch–Schönlein purpura. Because AHEI is a self-limiting disease, conservative treatment is common.

Snow described acute hemorrhagic edema of infancy in the United States in 1913. Finkelstein described it in Europe in 1938, and it has been recognized in European literature since then under various names. Synonyms include Finkelstein disease, Seidlmayer syndrome, infantile postinfectious iris-like purpura and oedema, and purpura en cocarde avec oedema.

AHEI is associated with a variety of organisms, including adenovirus, varicella-zoster virus, cytomegalovirus, herpes simplex virus, tuberculosis, streptococci, and staphylococci.

== Signs and symptoms ==
The typical clinical picture is edema on the cheeks, auricles, and extremities along with purpuric skin lesions. It has a violent onset, a brief and benign course, and recovers spontaneously after 1 to 3 weeks. Mild fever has been reported in the majority of patients.

AHEI typically begins with palpable hemorrhagic skin lesions and petechiae, which can progress to medallion-like lesions 1 to 6 cm in diameter. The rashes are usually sharply edged, and the centers of the iris-like lesions are rarely normal skin color. The extremities, including the ears, chin, eyelids, malar region, and scrotal area, are particularly affected. The trunk is usually unaffected. It has been described as a bullous variation with tense hemorrhagic blisters. Lesions, particularly those on the ears, can become necrotic and leave a scar.

Edema primarily affects the extremities, especially the backs of the hands and feet. It is frequently asymmetric and begins distally. It can spread to the forearms and legs, but it can also appear on the face, eyelids, earlobes, and even the scrotum. Edema can be painful. AHEI can sometimes appear without fever or edema but without purpura.

== See also ==
- Cutaneous small-vessel vasculitis
- Henoch–Schönlein purpura
