= Obstructive purpura =

- Specialty: Dermatology

Obstructive purpura is a skin condition that may result from mechanical obstruction to circulation, with resulting stress on the small vessels leading to purpura.

== See also ==
- Traumatic purpura
- Skin lesion
