= Methotrexate-induced papular eruption =

- Specialty: Dermatology

Methotrexate-induced papular eruption appears in patients being treated with methotrexate, such as those with rheumatic disease, presenting with erythematous indurated papules, usually located on the proximal extremities.

It has been suggested that it may represent a cutaneous small-vessel vasculitis.

== See also ==
- List of cutaneous conditions
