= Rheumatoid vasculitis =

- Specialty: Rheumatology

Rheumatoid vasculitis is a skin condition that is a typical feature of rheumatoid arthritis, presenting as peripheral vascular lesions that are localized purpura, cutaneous ulceration, and gangrene of the distal parts of the extremities.

== Signs and symptoms ==
Rheumatoid vasculitis may affect almost any organ in the body. The skin and peripheral nerves are the most frequently affected areas. Although major organ system involvement of the kidney, bowel, or heart is much less common, it can result in serious morbidity and mortality, such as renal failure, bowel ischemia, and myocardial infarction. While the involvement of the central nervous system is uncommon, numerous case reports document its occurrence.

Rheumatoid vasculitis can cause palpable purpura, ulcers, nodules, and digital necrosis on the skin. Even though it is nonspecific and present in many different disorders, livedo reticularis is frequently observed.

Peripheral nervous system involvement is the second most common organ involved. Peripheral nervous system manifestations include distal symmetric sensory polyneuropathy, distal motor or combined neuropathy, and mononeuritis multiplex.

== Causes ==
Patients who have nodular rheumatoid arthritis that is seropositive are nearly exclusively affected by rheumatoid vasculitis.

== Diagnosis ==
The patient's medical history and symptoms, physical examination, relevant laboratory tests, specialized testing (such nerve conduction studies), and tissue biopsy of the affected skin, muscle, nerves, or other organ are typically used to make the diagnosis.

== Treatment ==
Treatment options for mild cases of rheumatoid vasculitis affecting the skin or peripheral nerves include methotrexate or azathioprine combined with prednisone. More severe organ system involvement might need to be treated with biologic agents, cyclophosphamide, and higher doses of steroids.

== See also ==
- Rheumatoid nodulosis
- List of cutaneous conditions
