= Nonthrombocytopenic purpura =

- Specialty: Dermatology

Nonthrombocytopenic purpura is a type of purpura (red or purple skin discoloration) not associated with thrombocytopenia.

Nonthrombocytopenic purpura has been reported after smoking mentholated cigarettes.

Examples/causes include:

- Henoch–Schönlein purpura
- Hereditary hemorrhagic telangiectasia
- Congenital cytomegalovirus
- Meningococcemia
