= Palpable purpura =

Type of firm, hemorrhagic skin lesion, usually asymptomatic

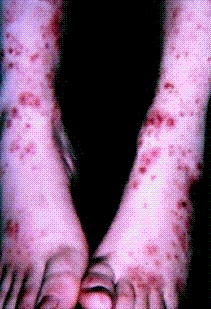
- Cutaneous small-vessel vasculitis with palpable purpura and necrotic lesions.

Palpable purpura is characterized by firm, elevated hemorrhagic plaques or papules that can measure several centimeters in diameter. These are typically found on dependent surfaces, like the back of a recumbent patient or the lower legs. The center of a lesion may become ulcerative, pustular, vesicular, necrotic, or nodular. They tend to be asymptomatic, but when nodular or ulcerative, they can become tender. Palpable purpura is the most common cutaneous lesion among individuals with inflammatory vascular injury, whereas nonpalpable purpura typically indicates bleeding caused by a platelet or coagulation disorder.

== Causes ==
There are numerous causes of palpable purpura, such as autoimmune diseases, drug reactions, vaccinations, and infections. The most common infectious causes are N. gonorrhoeae, S. aureus, and N. meningitides, however palpable purpura has also been caused by Mycoplasma spp., Rickettsiae, Mycobacterium, and very rarely by Treponema pallidum, Brucella spp., Yersinia, Campylobacter, and Bartonella. Viral causes include SARS-CoV-2, parvovirus, infection from HIV, hepatitis virus vaccine, hepatitis viruses, and occasionally influenza, varicella, and cytomegalovirus. In the pediatric population, noninfectious causes of palpable purpura include acute hemorrhagic edema of infancy and Henoch–Schönlein purpura.

Inflammation-induced damage to the skin's blood vessels causes palpable purpura. Palpable purpura is the clinical manifestation of leukocytoclastic vasculitis, which can be idiopathic or linked to sepsis, reactions to drugs, connective tissue diseases, cryoglobulinemia, hepatitis C or B infection, or underlying cancers. Children and young adults can develop Henoch–Schönlein purpura, a leukocytoclastic vasculitis that is frequently preceded by an upper respiratory infection with fever, abdominal pain, arthralgias, and renal vasculitis. Low serum complement levels, arthritis, facial and laryngeal edema, and urticarial lesions lasting longer than 24 hours are the hallmarks of urticarial or hypocomplementemic vasculitis.

Hypersensitivity vasculitis (HV) is a type of vascular inflammation that is primarily confined to the skin. It is typically brought on by a precipitating event, such as medication, and is characterized by leukocytoclasia and polymorphonuclear leukocyte infiltration of small blood vessels. The most common signs and symptoms are palpable purpura and joint symptoms.

Apart from vasculitis, palpable purpura can also result from cutaneous emboli. Gram-negative cocci Rickettsia species, gram-negative rods, and, in immunocompromised individuals, Candida species and opportunistic fungi can all result in infectious emboli. The symptoms of a disseminated gonococcal infection include fever, tenosynovitis, arthralgias, and a few vesiculopustules over the distal ends of the extremities that may have purpura or hemorrhagic necrosis. The symptoms of Rocky Mountain Spotted Fever, which is spread by ticks, include photophobia, headache, fever, chills, and myalgias. The skin eruption begins acrally, grows centripetally, and develops into small, blanchable, erythematous macules that eventually turn into ecchymoses, palpable purpura, and petechiae.

Meningococcemia is an uncommon infectious disease that causes fever, skin rash and lesions, ear and eye issues, and possibly a sudden, shocking state of extreme physical depression that could be fatal if medical attention is not received. The disease meningococcemia comes in two forms. Compared to chronic meningococcemia, which progresses in a waxing and waning manner, fluorescent meningococcemia develops more quickly and is more severe. Sepsis patients in critical condition may experience DIC and vascular collapse along with rapidly worsening petechiae, ecchymoses, as well as extensive palpable purpura or retiform purpura.

== See also ==
- Purpura
- Petechia
