= Solar purpura =

Skin bruising due to sun damage

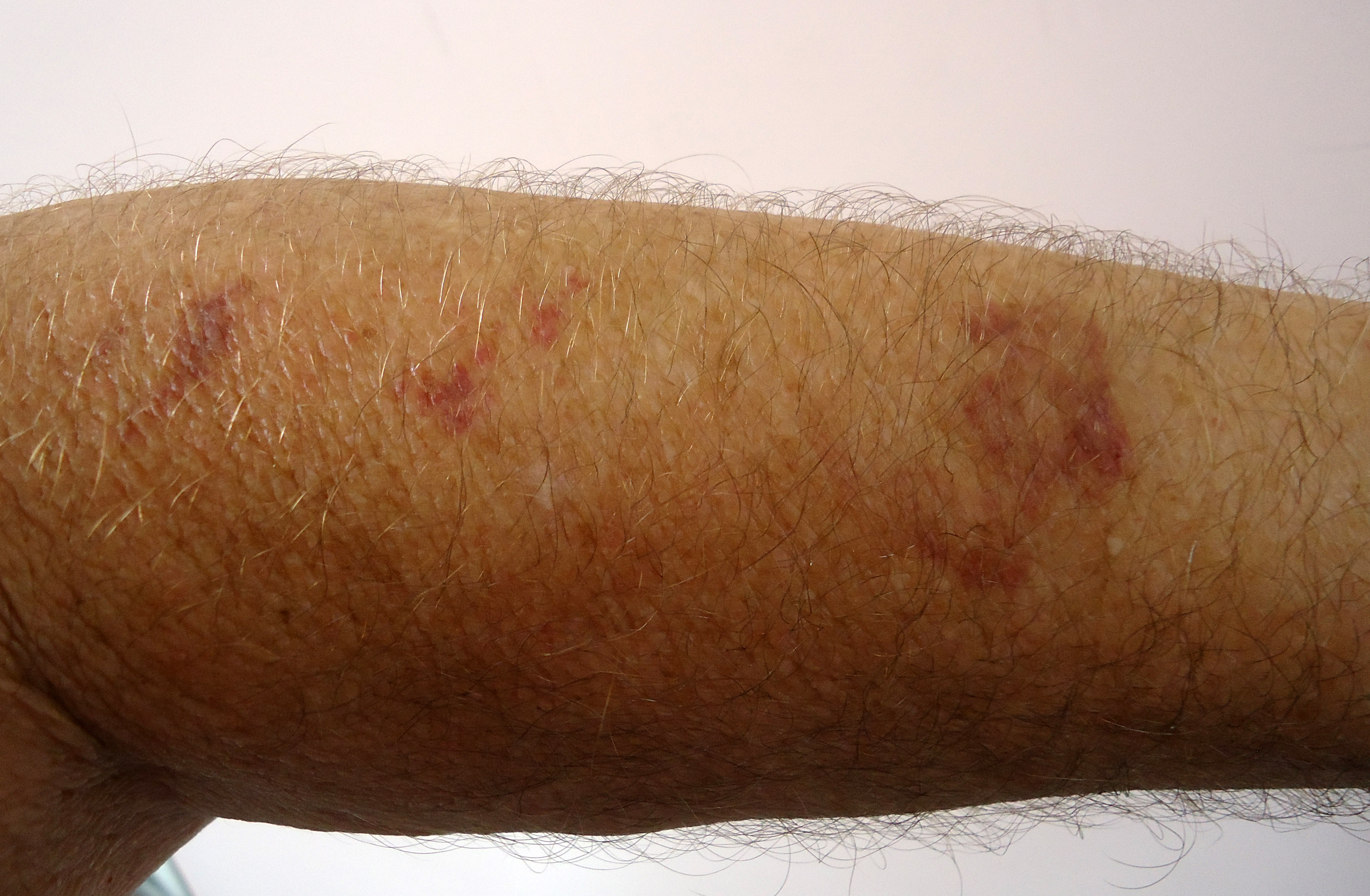
- Senile purpura
- Specialty: Dermatology

Solar purpura (also known as actinic purpura and senile purpura) is a skin condition characterized by large, sharply outlined, 1- to 5-cm, dark purplish-red bruises (purpura) appearing on the dorsa of the forearms and less often the hands.

The condition is most common in elderly people of European descent. It is caused by sun-induced damage to the connective tissue of the skin.

No treatment is necessary. The lesions typically fade over a period of up to three weeks.

== Pathophysiology ==
Solar purpura is believed to be caused by skin damage due to chronic sun exposure, which leads to dermal atrophy. As a result of the dermal atrophy, the dermal connective tissue cannot support the microvasculature, and the result is extravasation of blood into the dermis. This results in visible purple spots on the skin.

== Epidemiology ==
Solar purpura is most commonly seen in the elderly and those with lighter skin who are exposed to the sun. The prevalence increases with age and sun exposure.

== Histology ==
Skin samples under a microscope show thinned epidermis, reduced collagen, and extravasation of red blood cells. There are typically no inflammatory cells seen on solar purpura samples, but not always.

== Treatment ==
Solar purpura does not require treatment and may resolve on its own within weeks or months. The lesions may also be permanent. Many people seek treatment for cosmetic purposes. There have been several studies on possible future treatments. A common treatment involves Retinoic acid and other vitamin A derivatives in an attempt to increase dermal thickness and prevent extravasation of red blood cells. The most common treatment is to avoid UV exposure, apply sunscreen, and wear long-sleeved clothing.

== Complications ==
Solar purpura by itself does not cause any health complications. However, solar purpura does indicate thin skin and that a person is more prone to skin injuries. It is advised to take caution on preventing trauma to the skin since it is more prone to tears.

== See also ==
- List of cutaneous conditions
