= Transient erythroporphyria of infancy =

- Other names: Purpuric phototherapy-induced eruption
- Specialty: Dermatology

Transient erythroporphyria of infancy is a cutaneous condition reported in infants exposed to blue lights for the treatment of indirect hyperbilirubinemia characterized by marked purpura in skin exposed to the UV light.

== See also ==
- Porphyria
- Skin lesion
