= Orthostatic purpura =

- Other names: Stasis purpura
- Specialty: Dermatology

Orthostatic purpura, also known as stasis purpura, is a skin condition that results from prolonged standing or even sitting with the legs lowered (as in a bus, airplane, or train), which produced edema and a purpuric eruption on the lower extremities.

== See also ==
- Skin lesion
