= Erythema elevatum diutinum =

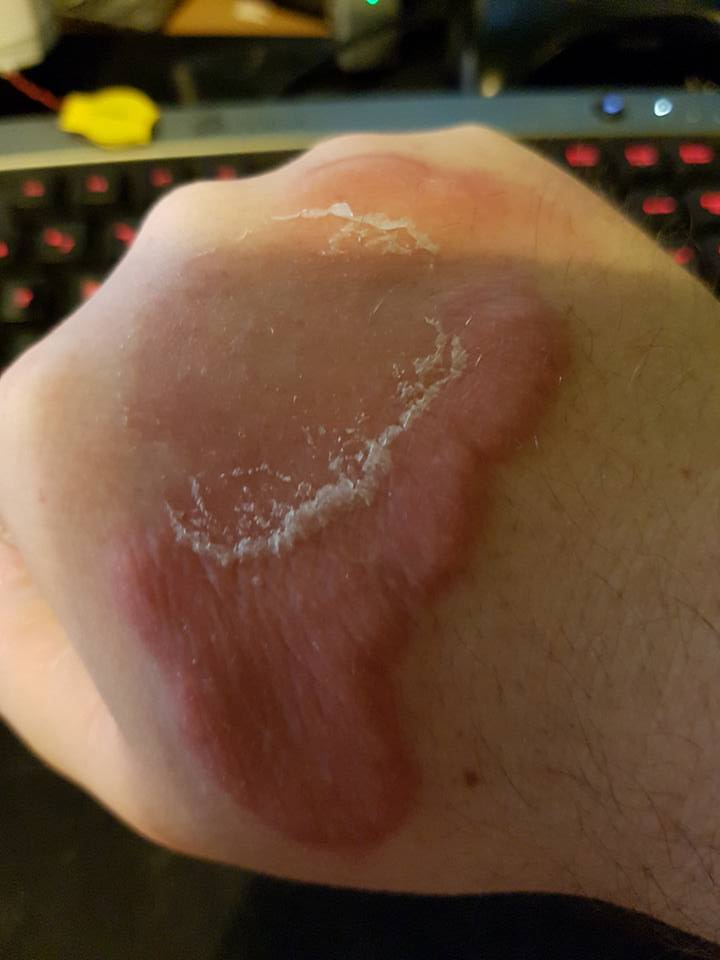
- Erythema elevatum diutinum seen on back of hand
- Specialty: Dermatology

Erythema elevatum diutinum is a form of vasculitis.

It has been described as a paraneoplastic syndrome.

== See also ==
- Cutaneous small-vessel vasculitis
- List of cutaneous conditions
