= Traumatic purpura =

- Specialty: Dermatology

Traumatic purpura is a skin condition resulting from trauma which produces ecchymoses of bizarre shapes suggestive of abuse.

== See also ==
- Obstructive purpura
- Skin lesion
