= Granuloma faciale =

- Other names: GF
- Specialty: Dermatology

Granuloma faciale is an uncommon benign chronic skin disease of unknown origin characterized by single or multiple cutaneous nodules, usually occurring over the face.

== History ==
GF was first described in 1945 by John Edwin Mackonochie Wigley (1892–1962).

== See also ==
- Cutaneous small-vessel vasculitis
- List of cutaneous conditions
