= Keratolytic winter erythema =

Genetic disorder causing redness and peeling of the skin on the palms and soles

- Other names: KWE, Erythrokeratolysis hiemalis
- Keratolytic Winter erythema has an autosomal dominant pattern of inheritance.

Keratolytic Winter erythema (also known as Oudtshoorn disease or Oudtshoorn skin) is a rare autosomal dominant skin disease of unknown cause which causes redness and peeling of the skin on the palms and soles. Onset, increased prominence and severity usually occurs during winter. It is a type of genodermatosis.

The name "Oudtshoorn skin" derives from the town of Oudtshoorn in the Western Cape province of South Africa, where the disorder was first described. It is one of several genetic disorders known to be highly prevalent among the Afrikaner population.

== Presentation ==
KWE is characterized by a number of anomalies affecting the skin. Erythema causes redness of the skin, which is generally associated with inflammation and irritation. Including erythema and hyperkeratosis (thickening of the stratum corneum), naturally occurring keratolytic peeling and scaling, with increased manifestation in winter, are prevailing features of the disorder.

Erythema in KWE has been attributed to necrobiosis (cellular death) within the Malpighian layer (the innermost layer of the epidermis). Peeling and scaling are caused by spreading dissection of the stratum corneum, correlating to the underlying necrobiosis.

The effects of KWE appear intermittently as patches on the skin of the palms and soles, with these patches appearing on the limbs, buttocks and torso in severe cases. Facial lesions of this type have also been reported with the disorder, though this is considered to be an extremely rare occurrence.

Onset and cyclical recurrence of KWE have shown to be associated with the arrival of winter, or winter-like weather. Worsening of symptoms during this time may be considered as an indicator of recurrent onset in patients known to have the disorder, and age of initial onset can be from early childhood to young adulthood, with attenuation of symptoms sometimes happening after age 30. Patients first exhibiting the disorder at a younger age may also experience worsened symptoms. Currently, no specific correlating factor or reason for winter-related manifestation has been established, though the coldness and dryer air common to winter conditions may be suspect. Winter onset is, however, considered to be a distinguishing feature of KWE among other erythematic skin disorders.

When peeling of skin occurs, the newly exposed layer of skin underneath is moist, raw and very sensitive. While this may result in minor discomfort and inconvenience, in severe cases of KWE where large areas of raw skin are present, it is often life-altering and debilitating. KWE is inherited in an autosomal dominant manner. This means that the defective gene responsible for the disorder is located on an autosome (chromosome 8 is an autosome), and one copy of the defective gene is sufficient to cause the disorder when inherited from a parent who also has the disorder.

KWE can begin as a spontaneous mutation, first appearing in an individual with no previous family history of the disorder. This may be due to a genetic predisposition for the disorder, possibly connected to the Oudtshoorn ancestral line.

== Genetics ==
KWE is inherited in an autosomal dominant manner. This means that the defective gene responsible for the disorder is located on an autosome (chromosome 8 is an autosome), and one copy of the defective gene is sufficient to cause the disorder when inherited from a parent who also has the disorder. KWE can begin as a spontaneous mutation, first appearing in an individual with no previous family history of the disorder. This may be due to a genetic predisposition for the disorder, possibly connected to the Oudtshoorn ancestral line.

== Pathophysiology ==
KWE is of unknown cause, as at the present time, no specific mutation of any gene has been established as the cause of the disorder. Research has shown, however, that the gene involved is located on human chromosome 8. The function of enzymes in general are fundamentally subject to temperature.

A candidate gene is a gene that is suspected to cause a disease or disorder. In KWE, this gene is known to be located in the area between chromosome 8q22 and 8q23. Within this region, the occurrence of loss of heterozygosity (simultaneous loss of function in both alleles of a gene) has been associated with malignancy, including certain types of breast and lung cancer. During the investigation for a KWE candidate gene in this same region, twelve protein transcripts were evaluated between microsatellite markers D8S550 and D8S1759, which is a critical area shown to be the source of KWE pathogenesis. Among the twelve transcripts identified, one corresponded to the BLK gene, which encodes the enzyme B-lymphoid tyrosine kinase. Four other of these transcripts included a myotubularin (MTMR8), a potential human homologue of the mouse Amac1 enzyme, a transcript similar to the mouse L-threonine 3-dehydrogenase gene, and one similar to a human oncogene. The remaining seven transcripts did not resemble any currently known genes. In all, none of the twelve transcripts displayed any evidence of pathogenic involvement with KWE. As a transcriptional map of this critical area is being drawn, based on microsatellite identification, haplotype analysis and other measures; localization of the gene associated with KWE pathogenesis is an ongoing process.

== Epidemiology ==
Oudtshoorn is a town in Western Cape (formerly Cape Province), South Africa, where KWE ("Oudtshoorn skin") was first described. The disorder is quite prevalent among Afrikaners of South Africa, a population which can be defined as caucasoid native-speakers of Afrikaans, with northwestern European lineage. Among this group, KWE occurs at a rate of approximately 1/7,200.

This relatively high rate of occurrence has been attributed to the founder effect, in which a small, often consanguinous population is formed out of the larger ancestral population, resulting in a loss of genetic diversity. In the context of KWE, the founder effect was confirmed by haplotype analysis, which indicates that the chromosomal origin of a possible genetic mutation responsible for the disorder is particularly common among affected Afrikaners. This is also true in other South Africans of European descent with KWE, and the chromosome of interest in both these and Afrikaner patients strongly points to an unspecified ancestor or ancestral group that may have settled around the Oudtshoorn area.

A second lineage known to exhibit KWE has been reported in Germany, although there it is less prevalent and appears to involve the chromosome from a different ancestral origin than that seen in Afrikaners. KWE has also been noted in other countries around the northwestern region of Europe, such as Denmark.

== See also ==
- Integumentary system
- Cape Town
- Africa
- List of cutaneous conditions
