= Erythema =

Redness of the skin or mucous membranes

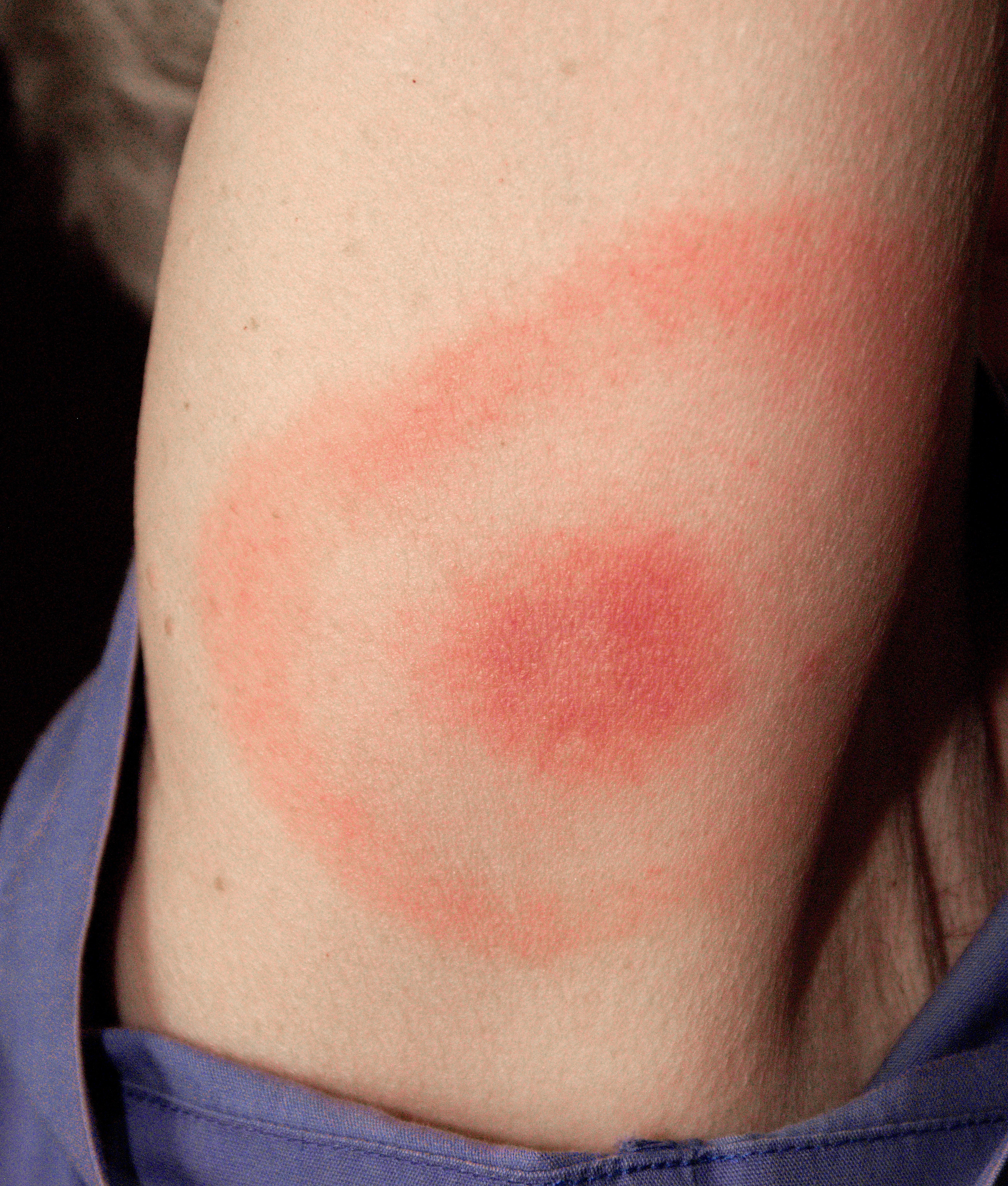
- Characteristic "bull's eye" rash (erythema migrans) of early Lyme disease
- Pronunciation: /ˌɛrɪˈθiːmə/ ERR-ih-THEE-mə
- Specialty: Dermatology

Erythema (/ˌɛrɪˈθiːmə/; Ancient Greek: ἐρύθημα, from Greek erythros 'red') is redness of the skin or mucous membranes, caused by hyperemia (increased blood flow) in superficial capillaries. It occurs with any skin injury, infection, or inflammation. Examples of erythema not associated with pathology include nervous blushes.

== Types ==
- Erythema ab igne
- Erythema chronicum migrans
- Erythema induratum
- Erythema infectiosum (or fifth disease)
- Erythema marginatum
- Erythema migrans
- Erythema multiforme (EM)
- Erythema nodosum
- Erythema toxicum
- Erythema elevatum diutinum
- Erythema gyratum repens
- Keratolytic winter erythema
- Palmar erythema

== Causes ==
It can be caused by infection, massage, electrical treatment, acne medication, allergies, psoriasis, mast cell activation syndrome (MCAS), exercise, solar radiation (sunburn), photosensitization, acute radiation syndrome, mercury toxicity, blister agents, niacin administration, or waxing and tweezing of the hairs—any of which can cause the affected capillaries to dilate, resulting in redness. Erythema is a common side effect of radiotherapy treatment due to patient exposure to ionizing radiation.

== Diagnosis ==
Erythema disappears on finger pressure (blanching), whereas purpura or bleeding in the skin and pigmentation do not. There is no temperature elevation, unless it is associated with the dilation of arteries in the deeper layer of the skin.

== See also ==
- Hyperemia
- Flushing (physiology)
- List of cutaneous conditions
