= Petechia =

Small red or purple blemish on the skin, eyes, etc. due to rupture of capillaries

- Other names: Petechiae
- Idiopathic petechiae on the thigh
- Pronunciation: pɪˈtiːkɪə
- Specialty: Rheumatology

A petechia (/pɪˈtiːkiə/; pl.: petechiae) is a small red or purple spot (less than 3 mm in diameter) that can appear on the skin, conjunctiva, retina, and mucous membranes which is caused by haemorrhage of capillaries. The word is derived from Italian petecchia 'freckle', of obscure origin. It refers to one of the three descriptive types of hematoma differentiated by size, the other two being ecchymosis (greater than 1 cm in diameter) and purpura (3 to 10 mm in diameter). The term is typically used in the plural (petechiae), since a single petechia is seldom noticed or significant.

Petechiae can be caused by a number of infectious or noninfectious conditions, or by physical trauma. The presence of petechiae in certain locations, such as the eyes or neck, are sometimes considered forensically significant, such as in cases of suspected strangulation.

== Causes ==
=== Physical trauma ===
The most common cause of petechiae is through physical trauma such as a hard bout of coughing, holding breath, vomiting, or crying, which can result in facial petechiae, especially around the eyes. Excessive scratching and friction, especially on thin and poorly circulated parts of the body may also cause petechiae. Such instances are generally considered harmless and usually disappear within a few days, but depending on severity and frequency may be indicative of an underlying medical condition.

- Constriction, asphyxiation – petechiae, especially in the eyes, may also occur when excessive pressure is applied to tissue (e.g., when a tourniquet is applied to an extremity or with excessive coughing or vomiting).
- Sunburn, childbirth, weightlifting
- Gua sha, a skin-scraping treatment in traditional Chinese medicine
- High-g training
- Hickey
- Oral sex

=== Non-infectious conditions ===
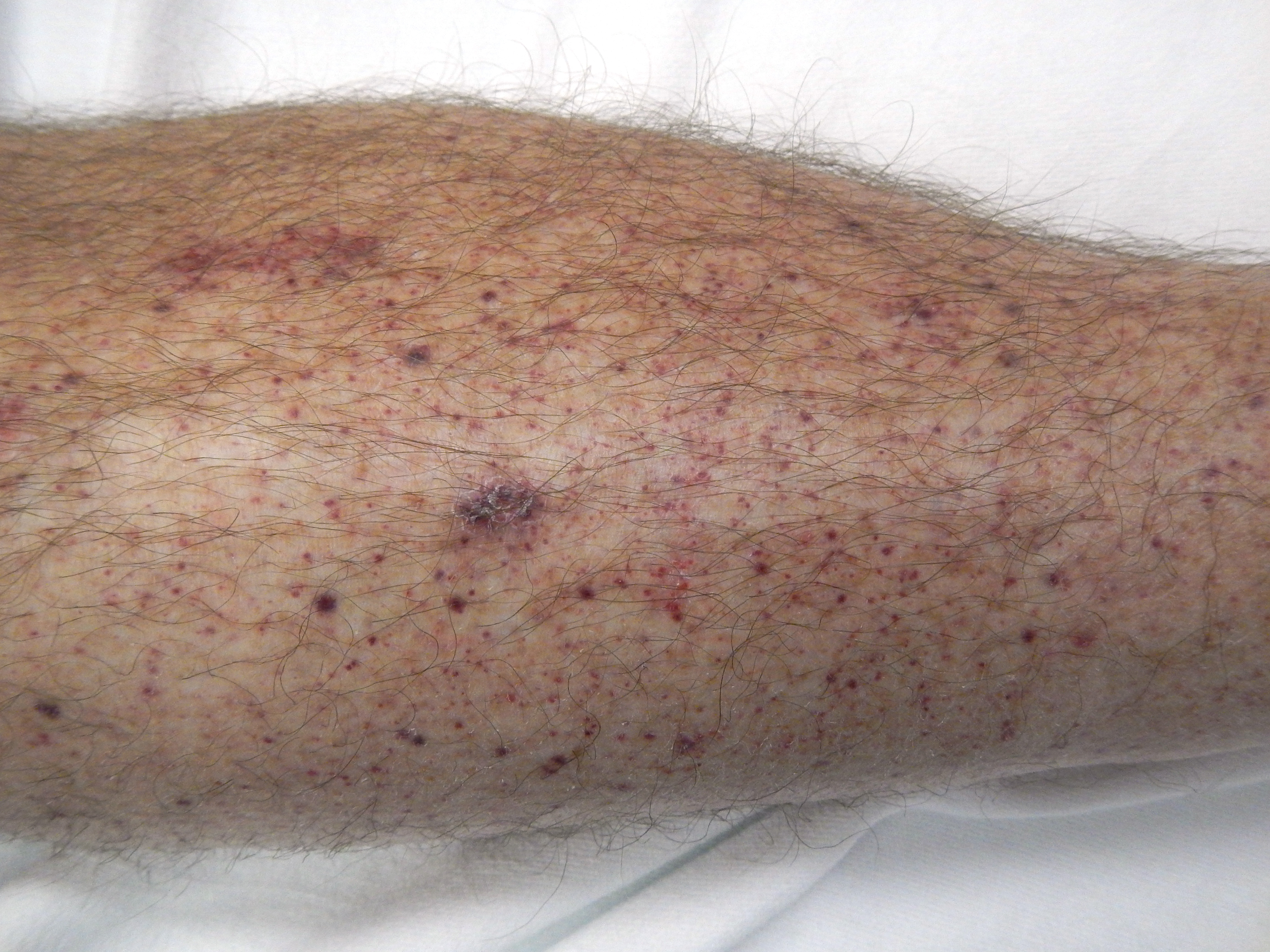
Petechia of the lower leg in a person with platelets of 3 due to ITP (immune thrombocytopenia).

- Vitamin C deficiency, scurvy
- Vitamin K deficiency
- Leukemia
- Thrombocytopenia – Low platelet counts or diminished platelet function (e.g., as a side effect of medications or during certain infections) can give rise to petechial spots
- clotting factor deficiencies – (Von Willebrand disease)
- Hypocalcemia
- Idiopathic thrombocytopenic purpura
- Coeliac disease
- Aplastic anemia
- Lupus
- Kwashiorkor or marasmus – Childhood protein-energy malnutrition
- Erythroblastosis fetalis
- Henoch–Schönlein purpura
- Kawasaki disease
- Schamberg disease
- Ehlers–Danlos syndrome
- Sjögren syndrome – Petechial spots could occur due to vasculitis, an inflammation of the blood vessels. In such a case immediate treatment is needed to prevent permanent damage. Some malignancies can also cause petechiae to appear.
- Radiation
- Fat embolism syndrome

=== Infectious conditions ===
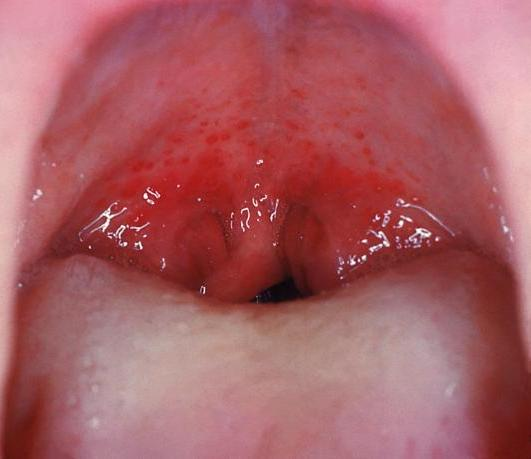
Petechiae on the soft palate due to strep throat

- Babesiosis
- Bolivian hemorrhagic fever
- Boutonneuse fever
- Chikungunya
- Cerebral malaria
- Congenital syphilis
- Crimean–Congo hemorrhagic fever
- Cytomegalovirus
- Dengue fever
- Dukes' disease
- Ebola
- Endocarditis
- Hantavirus
- Infectious mononucleosis
- Influenza A virus subtype H1N1
- Marburg virus
- Neisseria meningitidis
- Rocky Mountain spotted fever
- Scarlet fever
- Streptococcal pharyngitis – Petechiae on the soft palate are mainly associated with streptococcal pharyngitis, and as such it is an uncommon but highly specific finding.
- Typhus

== Forensic science ==
Petechiae on the face and conjunctivae are unrelated to asphyxiation or hypoxia. However, the presence of petechiae may be used by police investigators in determining whether strangulation has been part of an attack. The documentation of the presence of petechiae on a victim can help police investigators prove the case. Petechiae resulting from strangulation can be relatively tiny and light in color to very bright and pronounced. Petechiae may be seen on the face, in the whites of the eyes or on the inside of the eyelids.
