= Henoch–Schönlein purpura =

Autoimmune vascular inflammatory disease

- Other names: IgA vasculitis, anaphylactoid purpura, purpura rheumatica, Schönlein–Henoch purpura
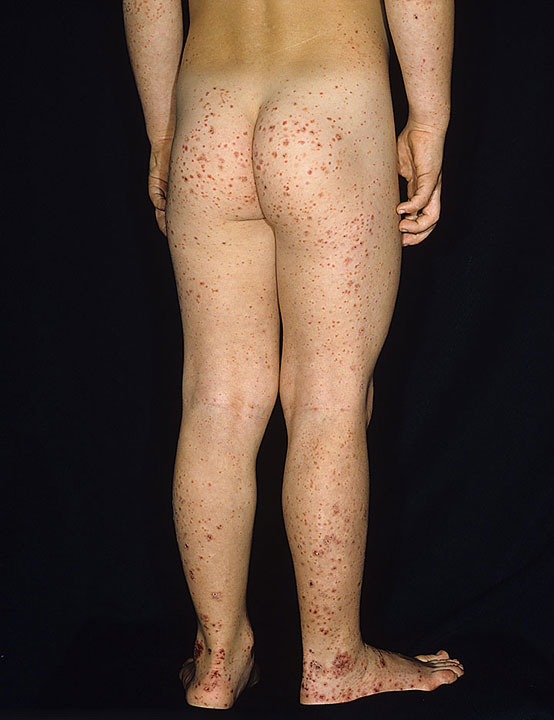
- Typical purpura on lower legs and buttocks
- Pronunciation: /ˈhɛnək ˈʃɜːnlaɪn, ˈʃoʊn-/
- Specialty: Rheumatology, Immunology

IgA vasculitis, previously known as Henoch–Schönlein purpura (HSP), is an autoimmune disease that most commonly affects children. In the skin, the disease causes palpable purpura (small, raised areas of bleeding underneath the skin), often with joint pain (arthralgia) and abdominal pain. With kidney involvement, there may be a loss of small amounts of blood and protein in the urine (hematuria and proteinuria), but this usually goes unnoticed; in a small proportion of cases, the kidney involvement proceeds to chronic kidney disease (CKD). HSP is often preceded by an infection, such as a throat infection.

HSP is a systemic vasculitis (inflammation of blood vessels) and is characterized by deposition of immune complexes containing the antibody immunoglobulin A (IgA); the exact cause for this phenomenon is unknown. In children, it usually resolves within several weeks and requires no treatment apart from symptom control but may relapse in 1 out of 3 cases and cause irreversible kidney damage in about 1 in 100 cases. In adults, the prognosis is different from in children. The average duration of cutaneous lesions is 27.9 months. For many, it tends to be relapsing–remitting over a long period of time, rather than self-limiting and there tend to be more complications.

== Signs and symptoms ==
Typical purpura on lower leg

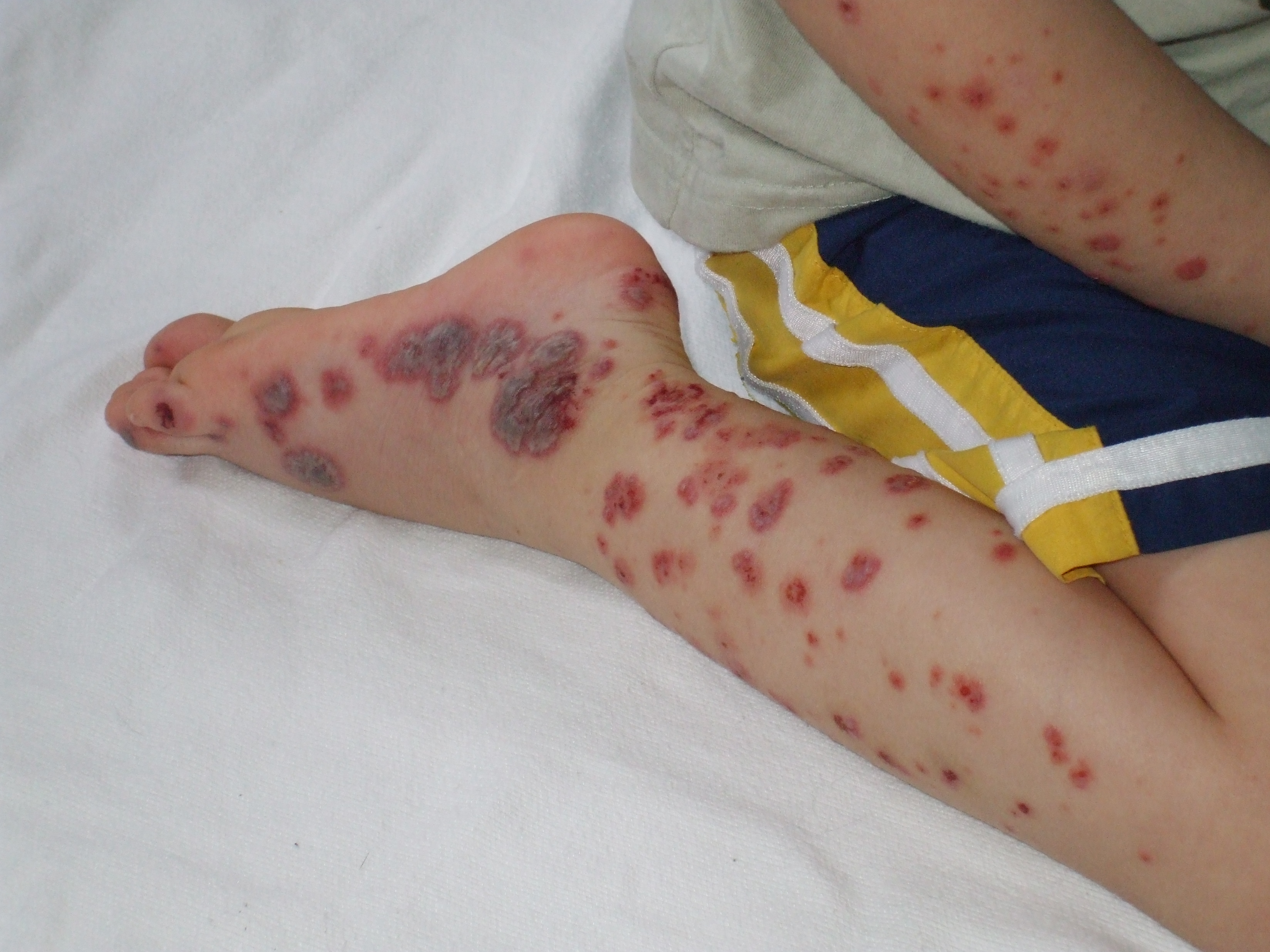
More severe case of HSP on child's foot, leg, and arm

Purpura, arthritis, and abdominal pain are known as the "classic triad" of Henoch–Schönlein purpura. Purpura occur in all cases, joint pains and arthritis in 80%, and abdominal pain in 62%. Some include gastrointestinal hemorrhage as a fourth criterion; this occurs in 33% of cases, sometimes, but not necessarily always, due to intussusception. The purpura typically appear on the legs and buttocks, but may also be seen on the arms, face and trunk. The abdominal pain is colicky in character, and may be accompanied by nausea, vomiting, constipation or diarrhea. There may be blood or mucus in the stools. The joints involved tend to be the ankles, knees, and elbows, but arthritis in the hands and feet is possible; the arthritis is nonerosive and hence causes no permanent deformity. Forty percent have evidence of kidney involvement, mainly in the form of hematuria (blood in the urine), but only a quarter will have this in sufficient quantities to be noticeable without laboratory tests. Problems in other organs, such as the central nervous system (brain and spinal cord) and lungs may occur, but is much less common than in the skin, bowel and kidneys.

Of the 40% of patients who develop kidney involvement, almost all have evidence (visible or on urinalysis) of blood in the urine. More than half also have proteinuria (protein in the urine), which in one eighth is severe enough to cause nephrotic syndrome (generalised swelling due to low protein content of the blood). While abnormalities on urinalysis may continue for a long time, only 1% of all HSP patients develop chronic kidney disease. Hypertension (high blood pressure) may occur. Protein loss and high blood pressure, as well as the features on biopsy of the kidney if performed, may predict progression to advanced kidney disease. Adults are more likely than children to develop advanced kidney disease.

== Pathophysiology ==
Henoch–Schönlein purpura is a small-vessel vasculitis in which complexes of immunoglobulin A (IgA) and complement component 3 (C3) are deposited on arterioles, capillaries, and venules (hence it is a type III hypersensitivity reaction). The activation of the alternative complement pathway results in the deposition of IgA aggregates or IgA complexes in target organs (with deposition of C3). This leads to the production of inflammatory mediators, including vascular prostaglandins like prostacyclin, which may play a key role in the development of IgAV and its organ-specific clinical manifestations. As with IgA nephropathy, serum levels of IgA are high in HSP and there are identical findings on renal biopsy; however, IgA nephropathy has a predilection for young adults while HSP is more predominant among children. Further, IgA nephropathy typically only affects the kidneys while HSP is a systemic disease. HSP involves the skin and connective tissues, scrotum, joints, gastrointestinal tract and kidneys. The genetic basis remains unclear except for involvement of the human leukocyte antigen region of the genome. It is hypothesized to involve autoimmunity triggered by infections. Streptococcus strains and Parainfluenza virus are the most commonly associated pathogens, and in children Human Parvovirus B19 is a frequent viral trigger

== Diagnosis ==
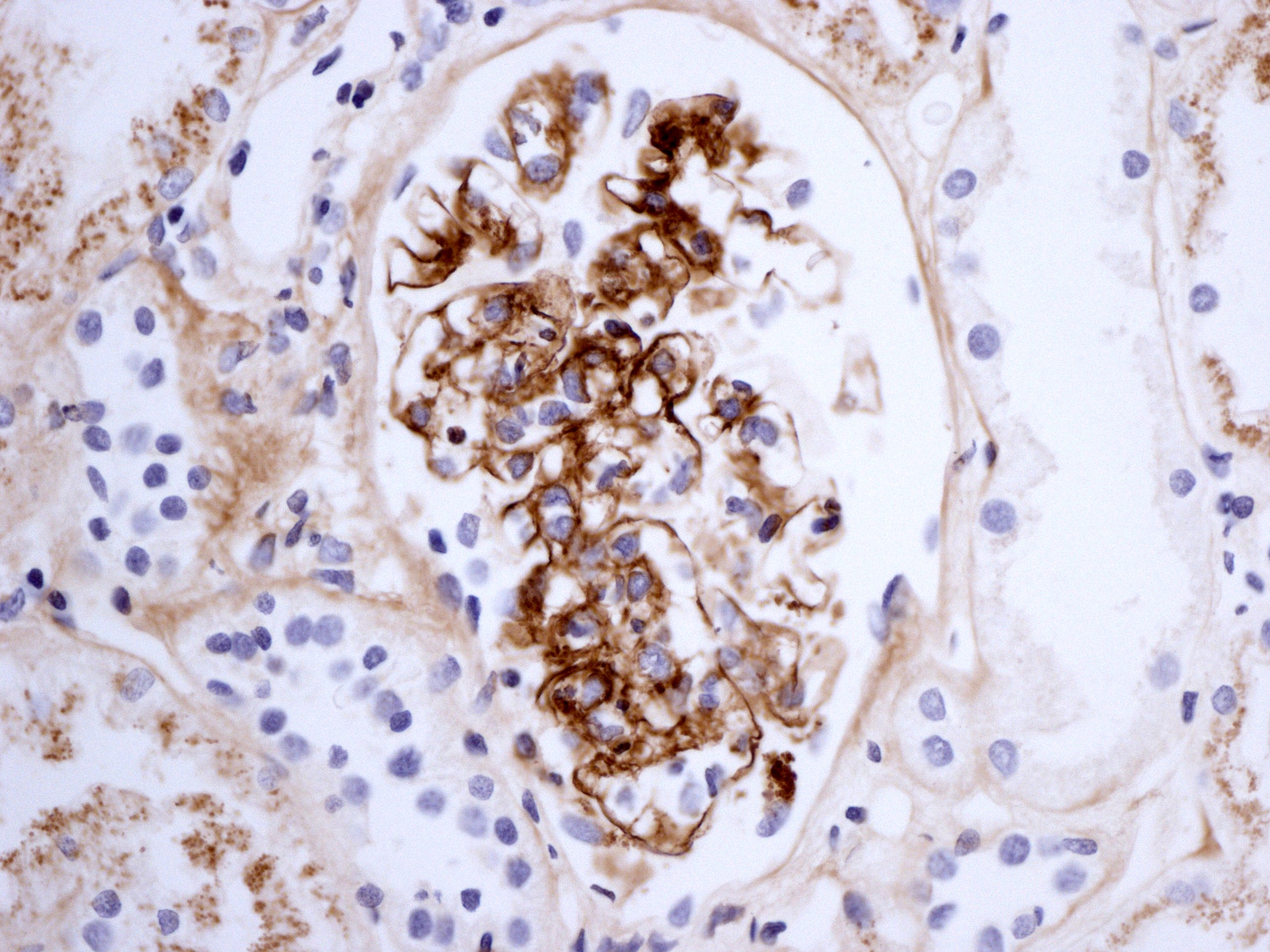
Immunostaining showing IgA in the glomerulus of a patient with Henoch–Schönlein nephritis

The diagnosis is based on the combination of the symptoms, as very few other diseases cause the same symptoms together. Blood tests may show elevated creatinine and urea levels (in kidney involvement), raised IgA levels (in about 50%), and raised C-reactive protein (CRP) or erythrocyte sedimentation rate (ESR) results; none are specific for Henoch–Schönlein purpura. The platelet count may be raised, and distinguishes it from diseases where low platelets are the cause of the purpura, such as idiopathic thrombocytopenic purpura and thrombotic thrombocytopenic purpura.

If there is doubt about the cause of the skin lesions, a biopsy of the skin may be performed to distinguish the purpura from other diseases that cause it, such as vasculitis due to cryoglobulinemia; on microscopy, the appearances are of a hypersensitivity vasculitis, and immunofluorescence demonstrates IgA and C3 (a protein of the complement system) in the blood vessel wall. However, overall serum complement levels are normal.

On the basis of symptoms, it is possible to distinguish HSP from hypersensitivity vasculitis (HV). In a series comparing 85 HSP patients with 93 HV patients, five symptoms were found to be indicative of HSP: palpable purpura, abdominal angina, digestive tract hemorrhage (not due to intussussception), hematuria and age less than 20. The presence of three or more of these indicators has an 87% sensitivity for predicting HSP.

Biopsy of the kidney may be performed both to establish the diagnosis or to assess the severity of already suspected kidney disease. The main findings on kidney biopsy are increased cells and Ig deposition in the mesangium (part of the glomerulus, where blood is filtered), white blood cells, and the development of crescents. The changes are indistinguishable from those observed in IgA nephropathy.

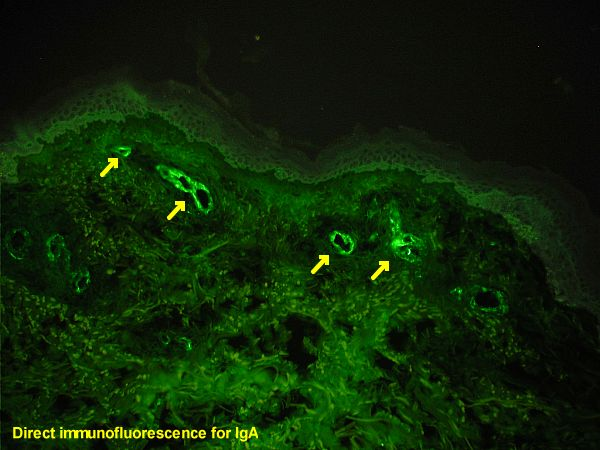
Microphotograph of a histological section of human skin prepared for direct immunofluorescence using an anti-IgA antibody, the skin is a biopsy of a patient with Henoch–Schönlein purpura. IgA deposits are found in the walls of small superficial capillaries (yellow arrows). The pale wavy green area on top is the epidermis, the bottom fibrous area is the dermis.

HSP can develop after infections with streptococci (β-haemolytic, Lancefield group A), hepatitis B, herpes simplex virus, parvovirus B19, Coxsackievirus, adenovirus, Helicobacter pylori, measles, mumps, rubella, Mycoplasma and numerous others. Drugs linked to HSP, usually as an idiosyncratic reaction, include the antibiotics vancomycin and cefuroxime, ACE inhibitors enalapril and captopril, anti-inflammatory agent diclofenac, as well as ranitidine and streptokinase. Several diseases have been reported to be associated with HSP, often without a causative link. Only in about 35% of cases can HSP be traced to any of these causes.

The exact cause of HSP is unknown, but most of its features are due to the deposition of abnormal antibodies in the wall of blood vessels, leading to vasculitis. These antibodies are of the subclass IgA_{1} in polymers; it is uncertain whether the main cause is overproduction (in the digestive tract or the bone marrow) or decreased removal of abnormal IgA from the circulation. It is suspected that abnormalities in the IgA_{1} molecule may provide an explanation for its abnormal behaviour in both HSP and the related condition IgA nephropathy. One of the characteristics of IgA_{1} (and IgD) is the presence of an 18 amino acid-long "hinge region" between complement-fixating regions 1 and 2. Of the amino acids, half is proline, while the others are mainly serine and threonine. The majority of the serines and the threonines have elaborate sugar chains, connected through oxygen atoms (O-glycosylation). This process is thought to stabilise the IgA molecule and make it less prone to proteolysis. The first sugar is always N-acetyl-galactosamine (GalNAc), followed by other galactoses and sialic acid. In HSP and IgAN, these sugar chains appear to be deficient. The exact reason for these abnormalities is not known.

=== Classification ===
Multiple standards exist for defining Henoch–Schönlein purpura, including the 1990 American College of Rheumatology (ACR) classification and the 1994 Chapel Hill Consensus Conference (CHCC). Some have reported the ACR criteria to be more sensitive than those of the CHCC.

More recent classifications, the 2006 European League Against Rheumatism (EULAR) and Pediatric Rheumatology Society (PReS) classification, include palpable purpura as a mandatory criterion, together with at least one of the following findings: diffuse abdominal pain, predominant IgA deposition (confirmed on skin biopsy), acute arthritis in any joint, and renal involvement (as evidenced by the presence of blood and/or protein in the urine).

=== Differential diagnosis ===
Henoch–Schönlein purpura may present with an atypical manifestation, which can be confused with papular urticaria, systemic lupus erythematosus, meningococcemia, dermatitis herpetiformis, and acute hemorrhagic edema of infancy.

== Treatment ==
As of 2017, the optimal way to treat Henoch–Schönlein purpura remains controversial. Analgesics may be needed for the abdominal and joint pains. Wound care is warranted if skin death and ulcerations occur. It is uncertain as to whether HSP needs treatment beyond controlling the symptoms. Most people do not receive therapy because of the high spontaneous recovery rate. Experts disagree on whether to routinely use corticosteroids as treatment for HSP. However, if they are given early in the disease episode, the duration of symptoms may be shortened, and abdominal pain can improve significantly. Moreover, the chance of severe kidney problems may be reduced. A systematic review did not find any evidence that steroid treatment (prednisone) is effective at decreasing the likelihood of developing long-term kidney disease.

Evidence of worsening kidney damage would normally prompt a kidney biopsy. Treatment may be indicated on the basis of the appearance of the biopsy sample; various treatments may be used, ranging from steroids by mouth to a combination of intravenous methylprednisolone (steroid), cyclophosphamide and dipyridamole followed by prednisone. Other regimens include steroids/azathioprine, and steroids/cyclophosphamide (with or without heparin and warfarin). Intravenous immunoglobulin (IVIG) is occasionally used.

There is no good evidence that treating children who have HSP with antiplatelet agent prevents persistent kidney disease. There is also no evidence that treating children or adults with cyclophosphamide prevents severe kidney disease. Heparin treatment is not justified for people with HSP.

== Prognosis ==
Overall prognosis is good in most patients, with one study showing recovery occurring in 94% and 89% of children and adults, respectively (some having needed treatment). In children under ten, the condition recurs in about a third of all cases, usually within four months of the initial attack. Recurrence is more common in older children and adults.

=== Kidney involvement ===
In adults, kidney involvement progresses to end-stage kidney disease (ESKD) more often than in children. In a UK series of 37 patients, 10 (27%) developed advanced kidney disease. Proteinuria, hypertension at presentation, and pathology features (crescentic changes, interstitial fibrosis and tubular atrophy) predicted progression. About 20% of children that exhibit nephrotic or nephritic features experience long permanent renal impairment.

The findings on renal biopsy correlate with the severity of symptoms: those with asymptomatic hematuria may only have focal mesangial proliferation while those with proteinuria may have marked cellular proliferation or even crescent formation. The number of crescentic glomeruli is an important prognostic factor in determining whether the patient will develop chronic renal disease.

In ESKD, some eventually need hemodialysis or equivalent renal replacement therapy (RRT). If a kidney transplant is found for a patient on RRT, the disease will recur in the graft (transplanted kidney) in about 35% of cases, and in 11%, the graft will fail completely (requiring resumption of the RRT and a further transplant).

== Epidemiology ==
HSP occurs more often in children than in adults, and usually follows an upper respiratory tract infection. Half of affected patients are below the age of six, and 90% are under ten. It occurs about twice as often in boys as in girls. The incidence of HSP in children is about 20 per 100,000 children per year, making it the most common vasculitis in children.

Cases of HSP may occur anytime throughout the year, but some studies have found that fewer cases occur during the summer months.

== History ==
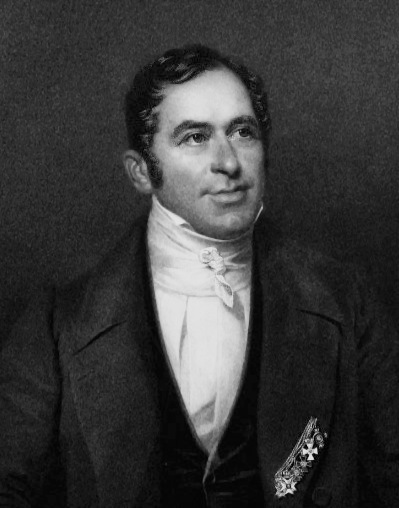
Johann Lukas Schönlein

The disease is named after Eduard Heinrich Henoch (1820–1910), a German pediatrician (nephew of Moritz Heinrich Romberg, the pioneer of neurology) and his teacher Johann Lukas Schönlein (1793–1864). Johann Schönlein described the condition as an entity in 1837; Eduard Heinrich Henoch in 1868 reported the first case of a patient with colic, bloody diarrhea, painful joints, and a rash. The English physician William Heberden (1710–1801) and the dermatologist Robert Willan (1757–1812) had already described the disease in 1802 and 1808, respectively, but the name Heberden–Willan disease has fallen into disuse. Moreover, Willan was the first to describe an exanthematous rash of childhood known as erythema infectiosum in 1799. In 1920, Eduard Glanzmann(1887-1959), a Swiss pediatrician noted for his contributions in the fields of infectious disease, vitamin therapy and, mostly the field of haematology. He recognised the role of allergy in the pathogenesis of Henoch–Schonlein purpura, hence the understanding of the allergic component in HSP. William Osler is also the first to recognise the underlying allergic mechanism of HSP. In 2012, the International Chapel Hill Consensus Conference Nomenclature of Vasculitides renamed HSP IgA vasculitis. Prior to this, the disease was more often known as Henoch–Schönlein purpura rather than the reverse.

== In popular culture ==
The disease was featured in the TV series House in the season 6 episode "Open and Shut".

== See also ==
- Cutaneous small-vessel vasculitis
