= Pulmonary hemorrhage =

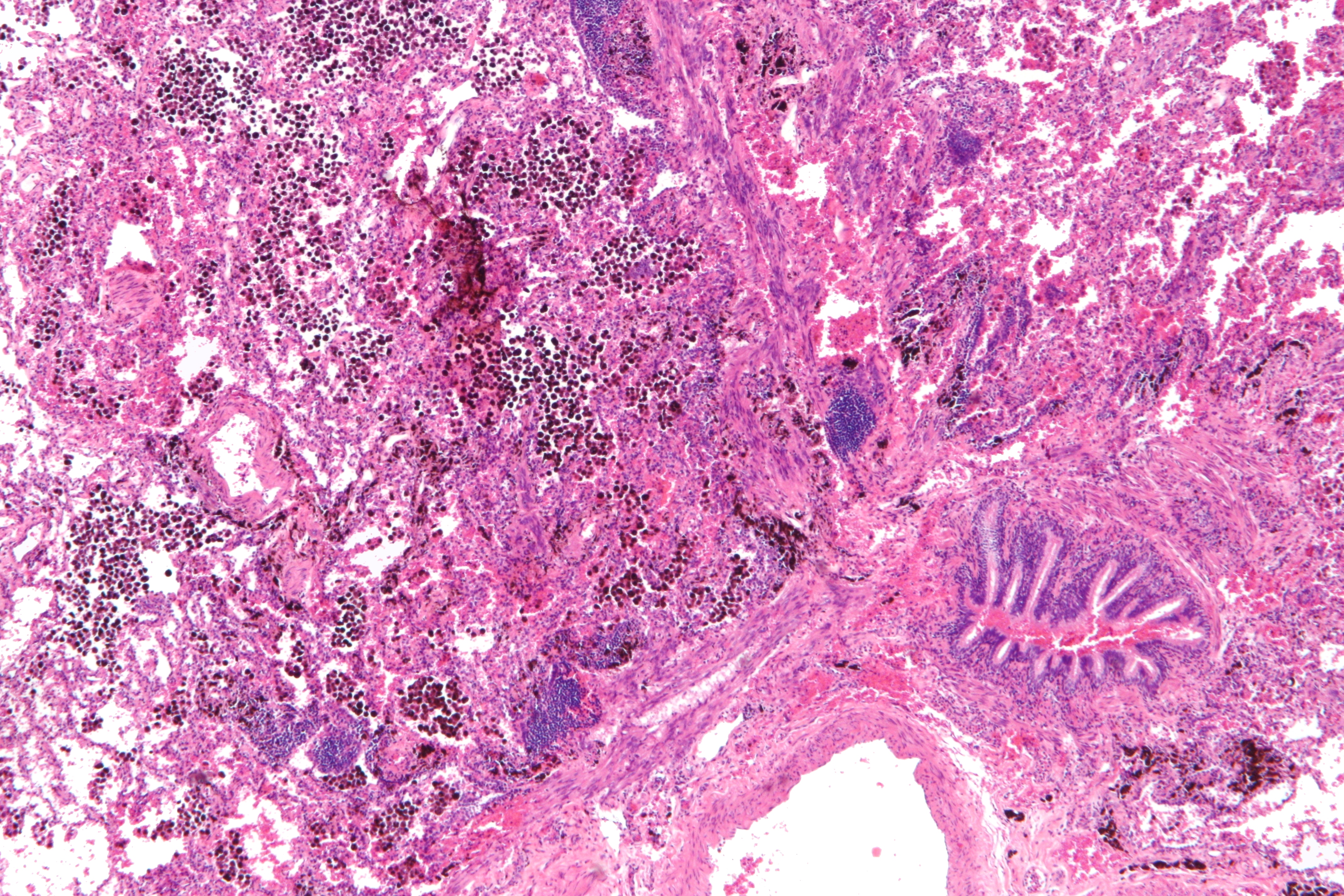
- Micrograph showing a pulmonary hemorrhage. H&E stain.
- Specialty: Pulmonology

Pulmonary hemorrhage (or pulmonary haemorrhage) is an acute bleeding from the lung, from the upper respiratory tract and the trachea, and the pulmonary alveoli. When evident clinically, the condition is usually massive. The onset of pulmonary hemorrhage is characterized by a cough productive of blood (hemoptysis) and worsening of oxygenation leading to cyanosis. Treatment should be immediate and should include tracheal suction, oxygen, positive pressure ventilation, and correction of underlying abnormalities such as disorders of coagulation. A blood transfusion may be necessary.

== Causes ==
Infant prematurity is the factor most commonly associated with pulmonary hemorrhage. Other associated factors are those that predisposed to perinatal asphyxia or bleeding disorders, including toxemia of pregnancy, maternal cocaine use, erythroblastosis fetalis, breech delivery, hypothermia, infection (like pulmonary tuberculosis), Infant respiratory distress syndrome (IRDS), administration of exogenous surfactants (in some studies) and extracorporeal membrane oxygenation (ECMO).

== Pathophysiology ==
Although the pathogenesis is uncertain, it is probable that the symptoms are a consequence of hemorrhagic pulmonary edema, as the hematocrit is lower than normal blood (usually 15-20% less) and the concentration of small proteins is higher than in plasma. It is postulated that the infant has asphyxia with resultant heart attack; this increases pulmonary microvascular pressure, resulting in pulmonary edema. Contributing factors include factors that favor increased filtration of fluid from pulmonary capillaries (e.g., low concentration of plasma proteins, high alveolar surface tension, lung damage, hypervolemia).

=== Diffuse alveolar hemorrhage ===
Diffuse alveolar hemorrhage is bleeding from many alveoli throughout the lungs. Common causes include autoimmune diseases and connective tissue diseases. Diagnosis of DAH is often given following observation of a patient presenting with hemoptysis, anemia, and cough, along with a chest X-ray showing alveolar infiltrates in the lungs, which are areas of air space in the lungs that are opacified and of higher density that normal, usually indicating that they are filled with a substance such as pus, blood, or another fluid.

== Incidence ==
The outcome of treatment is dependent on causality. Pulmonary Hemorrhage is present in 7 to 10% of neonatal autopsies, but up to 80% of autopsies of very preterm infants. The incidence is 1 in 1,000 live births. Pulmonary hemorrhage has a high mortality rate of 30% to 40%.

== See also ==
- Hemoptysis
