= Cutaneous small-vessel vasculitis =

Inflammation of small blood vessels, accompanied by skin bumps

- Other names: Hypersensitivity vasculitis, allergic vasculitis
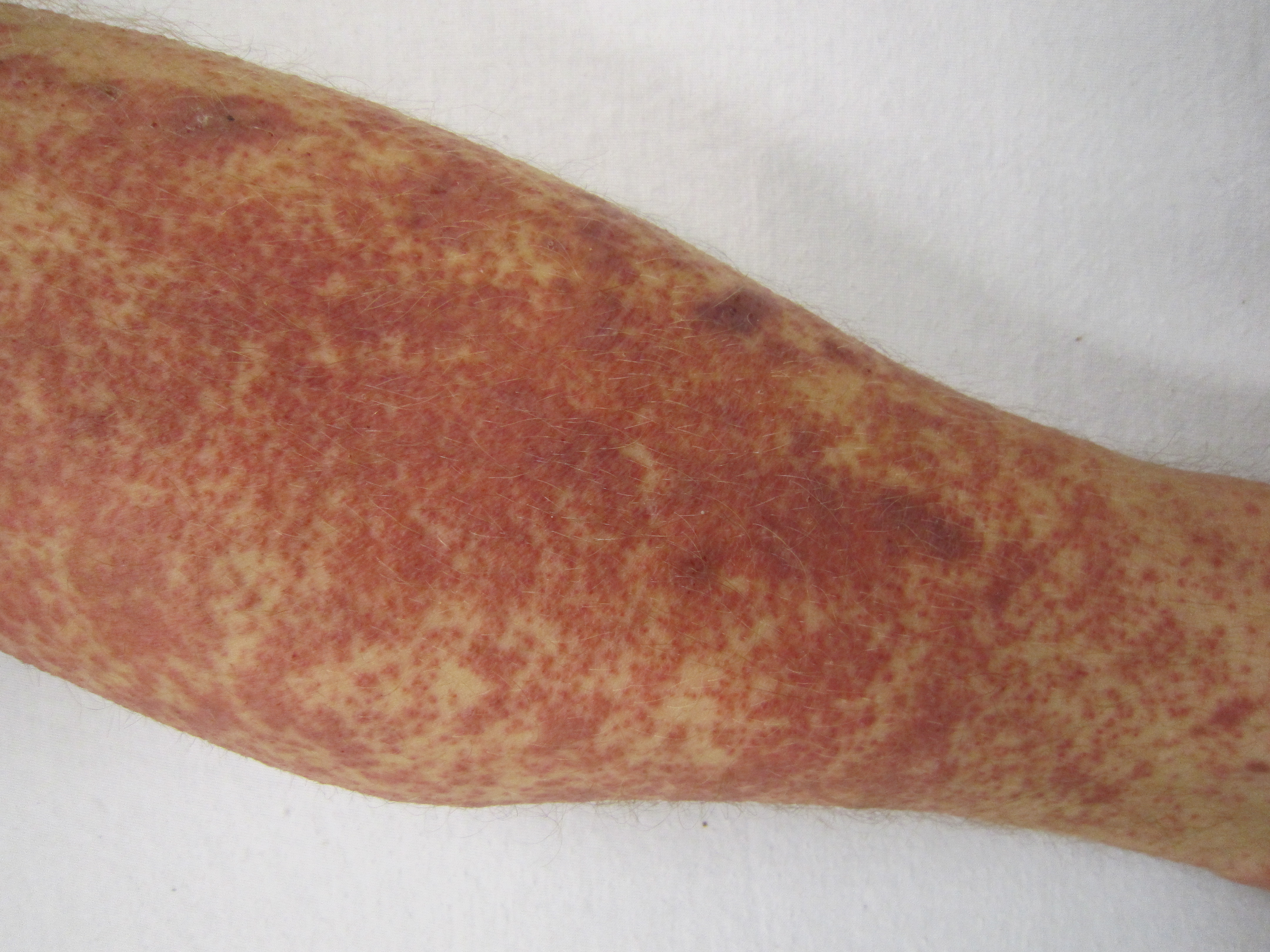
- Example of hypersensitivity vasculitis
- Specialty: Rheumatology, Immunology

Cutaneous small-vessel vasculitis (CSVV) is inflammation of small blood vessels, usually accompanied by small lumps beneath the skin. The condition is also known as hypersensitivity vasculitis, cutaneous leukocytoclastic vasculitis, hypersensitivity angiitis, cutaneous leukocytoclastic angiitis, cutaneous necrotizing vasculitis and cutaneous necrotizing venulitis,

It is the most common form of vasculitis seen in clinical practice, usually caused by inflammation of post-capillary venules in the dermis).

"Leukocytoclastic" (literally meaning 'leukocyte-destroying') refers to the damage caused by nuclear debris from infiltrating neutrophils in and around the vessels.

== Signs and symptoms ==
=== Skin lesions ===
Initially red to pink, flat spots (formally, "macules") and raised bumps (formally, "papules") may be seen on the skin.

Once fully developed, the classic appearance is "non-blanching, palpable purpura". This appears as deep red to purple spots that feel raised to the touch. Purpura refers to the red-purple discolored spots, while palpable implies that these spots can be felt as raised from the surrounding skin. Additionally, when gently pressed, the color does not fade to a lighter color ("non-blanching"). The red-purple color of the lesions is due to the inflammation in the blood vessels, causing red blood cells to escape into the dermis skin layer.

Small fluid-filled blisters (or "vesicles"), pus-filled bumps resembling a pimple (or "pustules"), or shallow ulcers may also develop but are less common.

The location of skin lesions varies, but they are most commonly found symmetrically below the waist, primarily on the buttocks and legs. Other distributions include localized areas on the upper body or over several areas of the body.

With treatment, the lesions typically resolve in weeks to months and leave behind flat spots that are darker than the surrounding skin (see "Postinflammatory hyperpigmentation" on "Hyperpigmentation").

A portion of cases may be persistent or recurrent. This tends to occur when the vasculitis is associated with chronic conditions such as connective tissue diseases.

=== Associated symptoms ===
In most cases, skin lesions do not cause symptoms; however, itching, burning, or pain may occur.

Frequently reported symptoms include mild fever, muscle pain, joint pain, or an overall feeling of discomfort. Additional symptoms depend on the cause of the vasculitis and if other organ systems are involved. For example, if the vasculitis is a manifestation of Henoch–Schönlein purpura, individuals may also experience abdominal pain or blood in the urine.

== Cause ==
Cutaneous vasculitis can have various causes, including but not limited to medications, bacterial and viral infections, or allergens. It is estimated that 45–55% of cases are idiopathic, meaning the cause is unknown. In cases where a cause can be determined, medications and infectious pathogens are most common in adults, while IgA vasculitis (Henoch–Schönlein purpura) frequently affects children. Other etiologies include autoimmune conditions and malignancies, usually hematologic (related to the blood).

Most Common Etiologies in Adults
Cause	Frequency	Examples
Idiopathic	45–55%	Cause unknown
Infection	15–20%	Staphylococcus and Streptococcus spp.
Autoimmune	15–20%	Rheumatoid arthritis, Systemic lupus erythematosus
Medications	10–15%	Antibiotics, nonsteroidal anti-inflammatory drugs (NSAIDs)

The small vessels in the skin affected are located in the superficial dermis and include arterioles (small arteries carrying blood to capillaries), capillaries, and venules (small veins receiving blood from capillaries). In general, immune complexes deposit in vessel walls leading to activation of the complement system. C3a and C5a, proteins produced from the complement system, attract neutrophils to the vessels. Once activated, neutrophils then release preformed substances, including enzymes, causing damage to vessel tissue. Evidence of this process can be seen with a sample of removed skin tissue, or biopsy, viewed under a microscope. Neutrophils are seen surrounding blood vessels and their debris within vessel walls, causing fibrinoid necrosis. This finding on histological examination is termed "leukocytoclastic vasculitis".

Considering the wide range of potential causes leading to cutaneous small vessel vasculitis, there are subtle variations in the underlying pathophysiology for each cause. For example, medications are metabolized to smaller molecules that can attach to proteins in the blood or vessel walls. The immune system senses these altered proteins as foreign and produces antibodies in efforts to eliminate them from the body. A similar process occurs with infectious agents, such as bacteria, in which antibodies target microbial components.

== Diagnosis ==
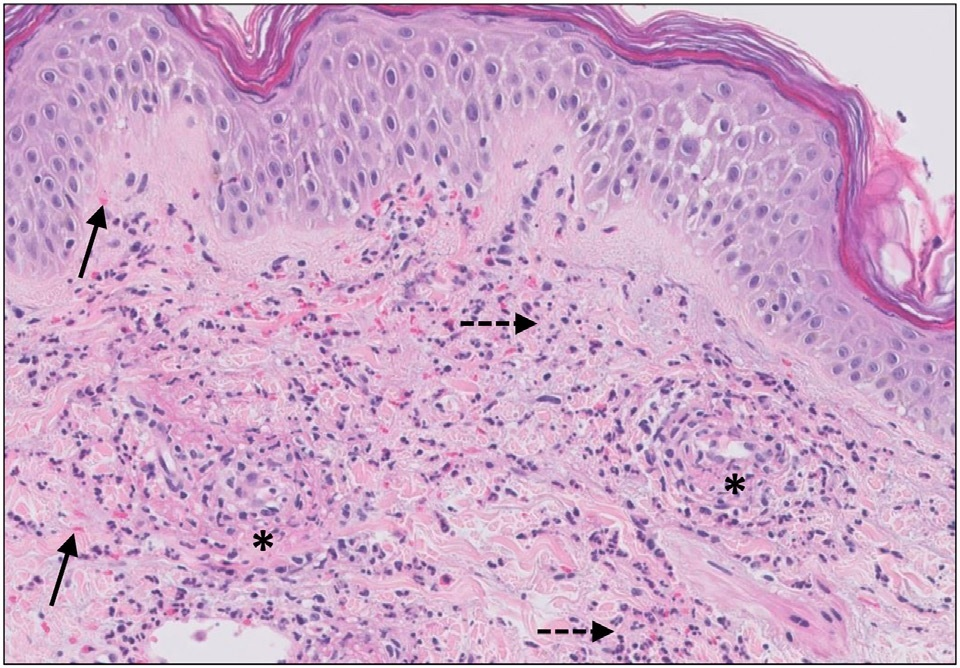
Micrograph of cutaneous small-vessel vasculitis. The section shows all features of leucocytoclastic vasculitis. A mixed inflammatory cell population surrounds the postcapillary venules of the superficial dermis. The infiltrate consists of neutrophils with nuclear dust (dashed arrows) and shows high affinity for the vessels. Features of vascular injury are shown, including fibrinoid necrosis (asterisks) and erythrocyte extravasation (solid arrows).

The diagnostic testing for vasculitis should be guided by the patient's history and physical exam. The clinician should ask about the duration, onset, and presence of any associated symptoms such as weight loss or fatigue (that would indicate a systemic cause). It is important to distinguish between IgA and non-IgA vasculitis. IgA vasculitis is more likely to present with abdominal pain, bloody urine, and joint pain. In the case that the cause is not obvious, a reasonable initial workup would include a complete blood count, urinalysis, basic metabolic panel, fecal occult blood testing, erythrocyte sedimentation rate (ESR), and C-reactive protein level. Small vessel cutaneous vasculitis is a diagnosis of exclusion and requires ruling out systemic causes of the skin findings. Skin biopsy (punch or excisional) is the most definitive diagnostic test and should be performed with 48 hours of appearance of the vasculitis. A skin biopsy will be able to determine if the clinical findings are truly due to a vasculitis or due to some other cause.

=== Classification ===
Subtypes of small-vessel vasculitis include:

- IgA vasculitis (Henoch-Schönlein purpura)
- Acute hemorrhagic edema of infancy
- Urticarial vasculitis
- Cryoglobulinemic vasculitis
- Erythema elevatum diutinum
- Granuloma faciale
- ANCA-associated vasculitis
- Arthropod bites
- Platelet dysfunction or deficiency
- Cholesterol emboli
- Septic emboli
- Livedoid vasculopathy

== Treatment ==
Treatment should be directed towards the specific underlying cause of the vasculitis. If no underlying cause is found and the vasculitis is truly limited to the skin, then treatment is primarily supportive. Such treatment involves measures such as leg elevation, stockings, and topical steroids to relieve itching/burning. If the vasculitis does not self-resolve within 3–4 weeks, more aggressive treatment may be warranted. Oral colchicine or dapsone are often used for this purpose. If rapid control of symptoms is needed, a short course of high-dose oral steroids may be given. Immunosuppressive agents such as methotrexate and azathioprine may be used in truly refractory cases not responsive to colchicine or dapsone.

== Additional images ==
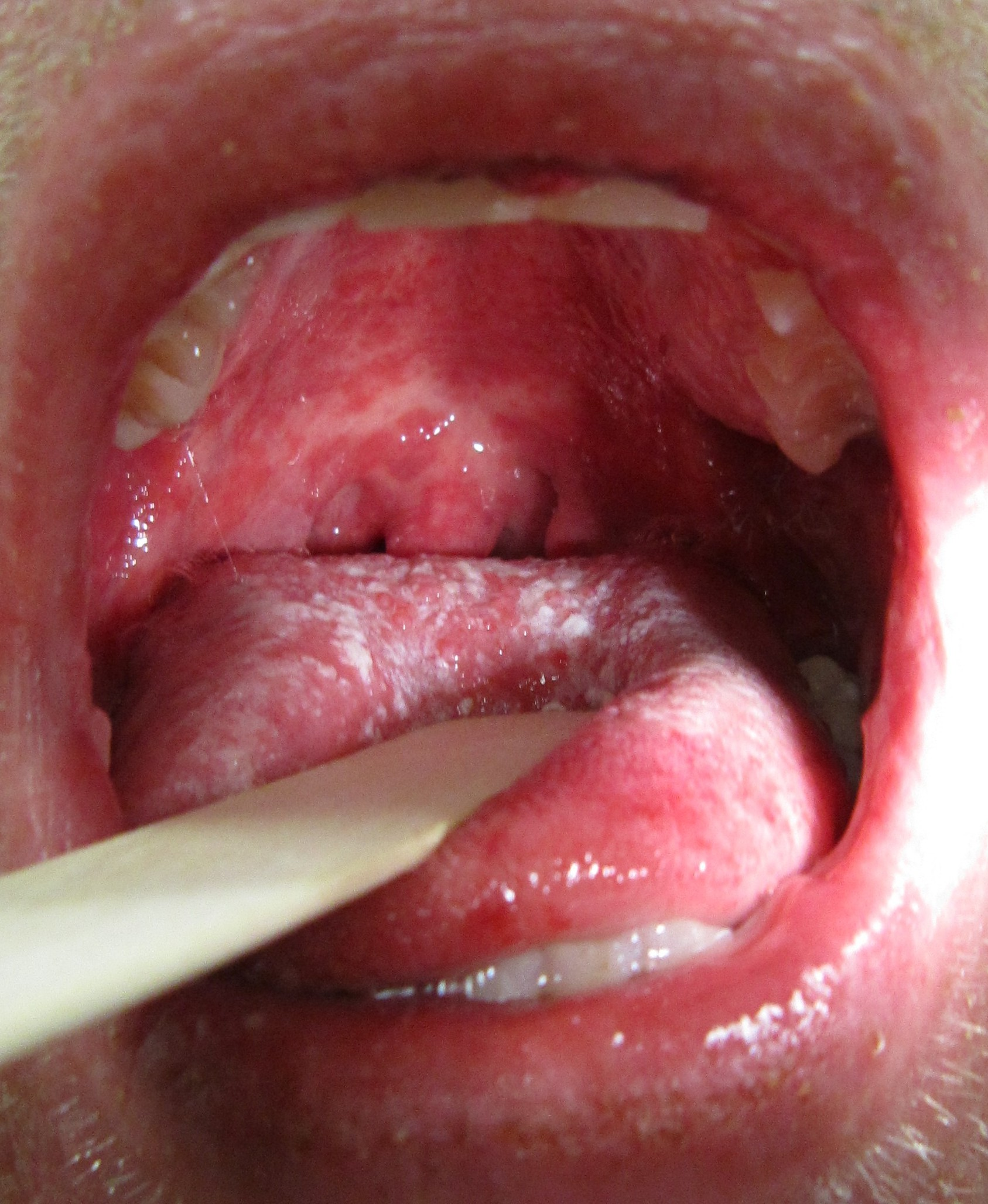

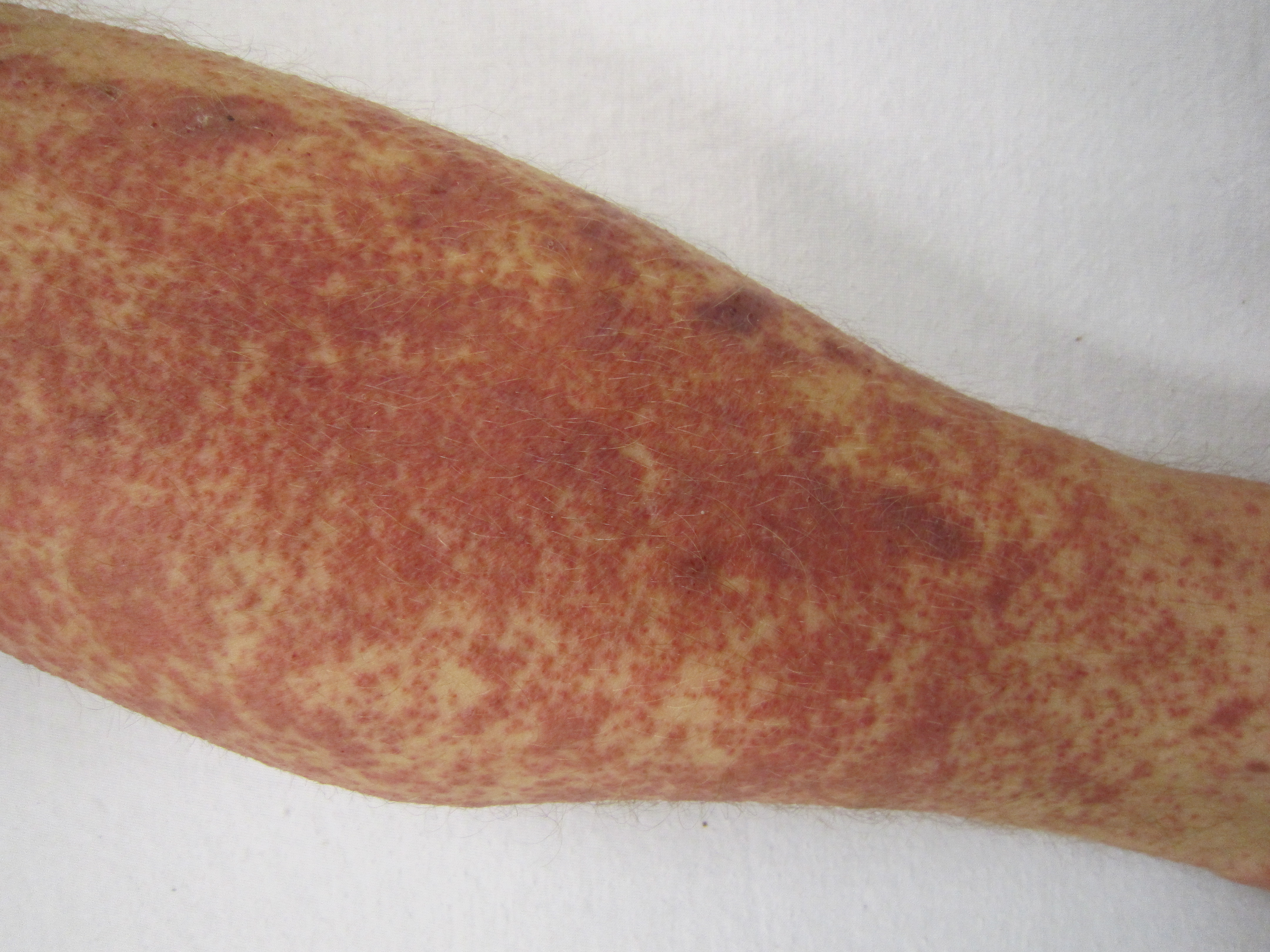

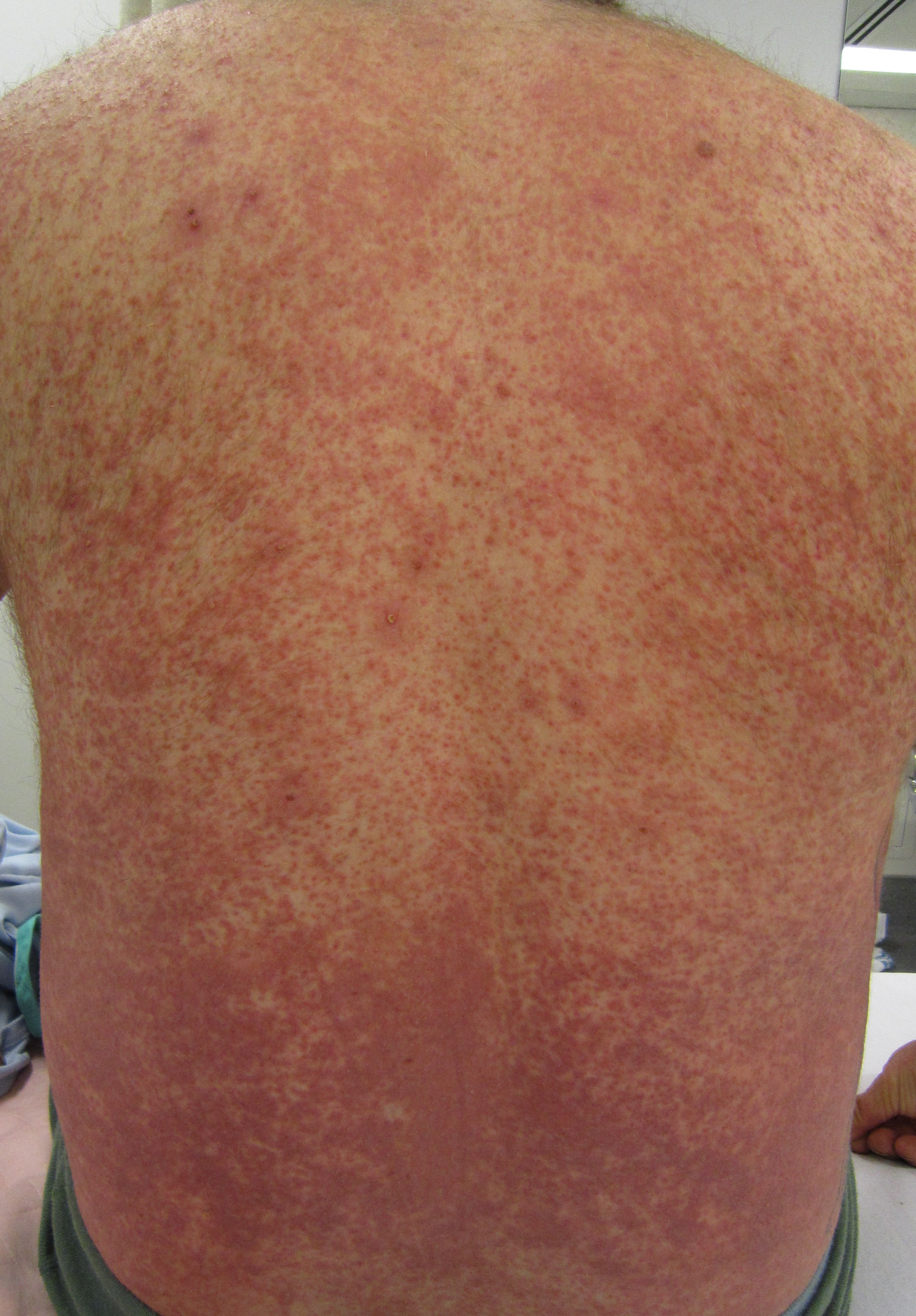

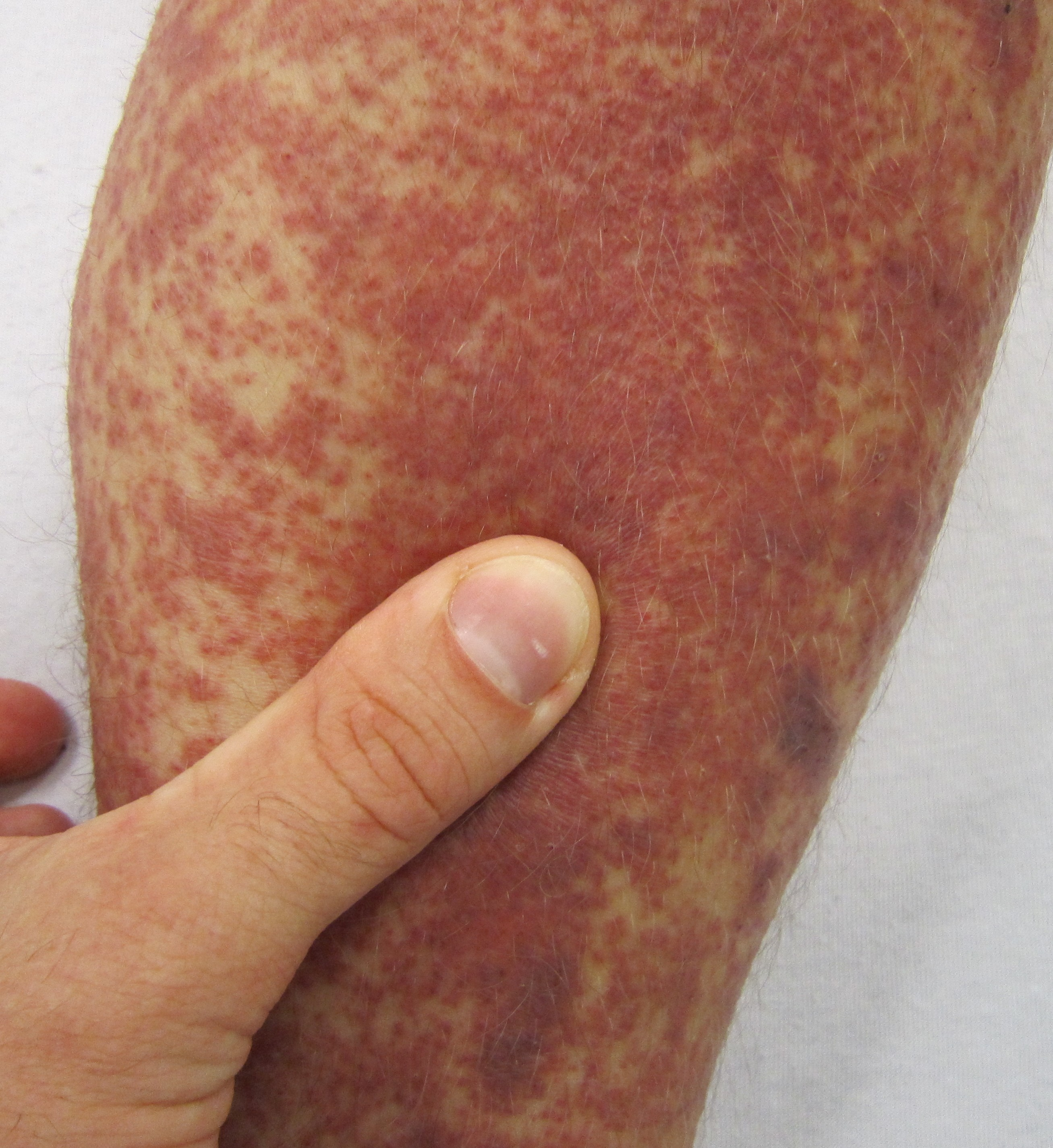

== See also ==
- Skin lesion
- List of cutaneous conditions
