= Purpura =

Skin discoloration due to underlying bleeding

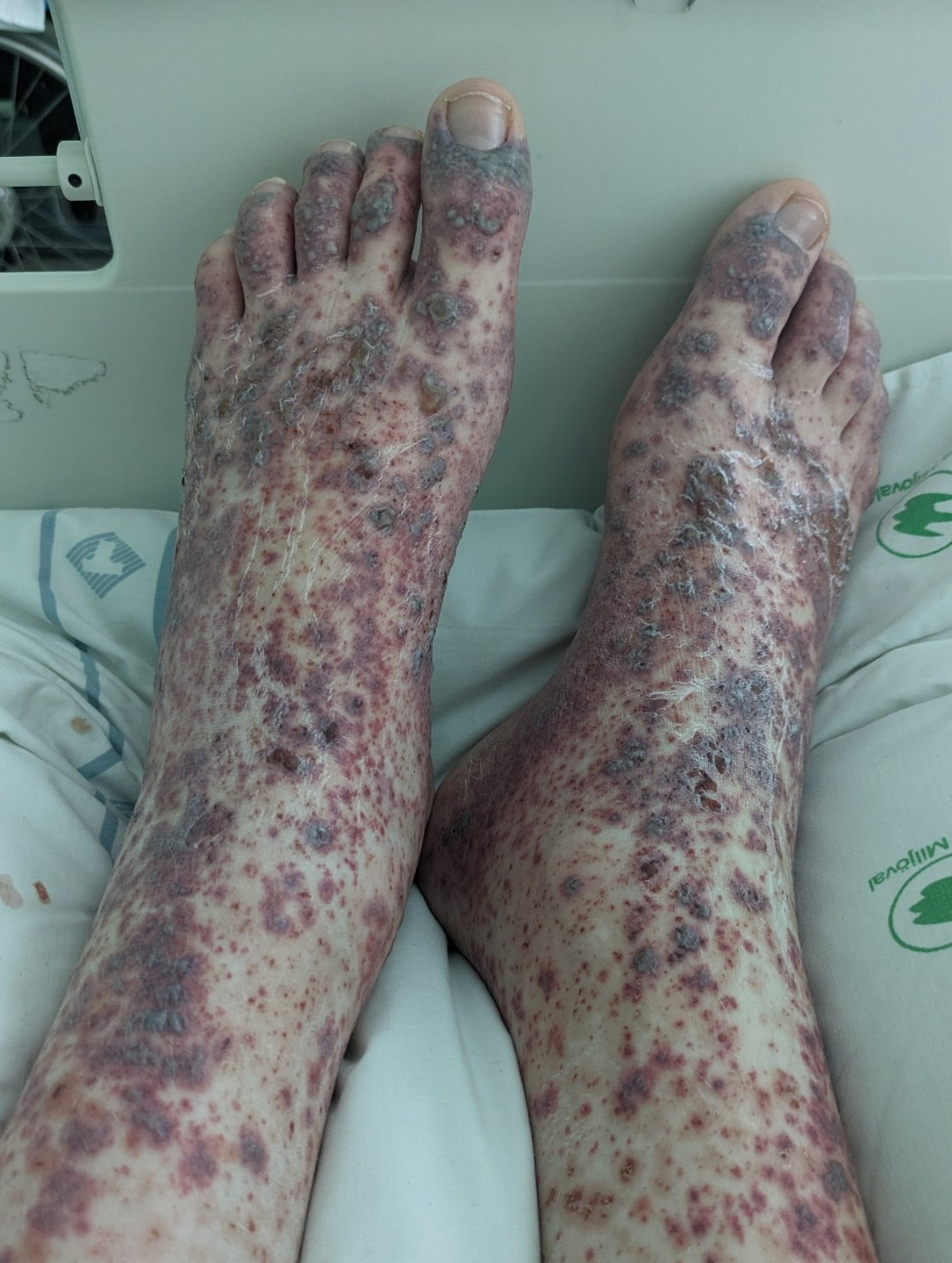
- Petechiae and purpura on the lower limb due to infection-associated vasculitis
- Specialty: Dermatology, hematology

Purpura (/ˈpɜːrpjʊərə/) is a condition of red or purple discolored spots on the skin that do not blanch on applying pressure. The spots are caused by bleeding underneath the skin secondary to platelet disorders, vascular disorders, coagulation disorders, or other causes. They measure 3–10 mm, whereas petechiae measure less than 3 mm, and ecchymoses greater than 1 cm.

Purpura is common with typhus and can be present with meningitis caused by meningococci or septicaemia. In particular, meningococcus (Neisseria meningitidis), a Gram-negative diplococcus organism, releases endotoxin when it lyses. Endotoxin activates the Hageman factor (clotting factor XII), which causes disseminated intravascular coagulation (DIC). The DIC is what appears as a rash on the affected individual.

== Classification ==
Purpura are a common and nonspecific medical sign; however, the underlying mechanism commonly involves one of:

- Platelet disorders (thrombocytopenic purpura)
  - Primary thrombocytopenic purpura
  - Secondary thrombocytopenic purpura
  - Post-transfusion purpura
- Vascular disorders (nonthrombocytopenic purpura)
  - Microvascular injury, as seen in senile (old age) purpura, when blood vessels are more easily damaged
  - Hypertensive states
  - Deficient vascular support
  - Vasculitis, as in the case of Henoch–Schönlein purpura
- Coagulation disorders
  - Disseminated intravascular coagulation (DIC)
  - Scurvy (vitamin C deficiency) – defect in collagen synthesis due to lack of hydroxylation of procollagen results in weakened capillary walls and cells
- Meningococcemia
- Clumping fibrillary protein deposits caused by Amyloidosis
- Cocaine use with concomitant use of the one-time chemotherapy drug and now veterinary deworming agent levamisole can cause purpura of the ears, face, trunk, or extremities, sometimes needing reconstructive surgery. Levamisole is purportedly a common cutting agent.
- Decomposition of blood vessels including purpura is a symptom of acute radiation poisoning in excess of 2 Grays of radiation exposure. This is an uncommon cause in general, but is commonly seen in victims of nuclear disaster.

Cases of psychogenic purpura are also described in the medical literature, some claimed to be due to "autoerythrocyte sensitization". Other studies suggest the local (cutaneous) activity of tissue plasminogen activator can be increased in psychogenic purpura, leading to substantial amounts of localized plasmin activity, rapid degradation of fibrin clots, and resultant bleeding. Petechial rash is also characteristic of a rickettsial infection.

== Etymology and pronunciation ==
The word purpura (/ˈpɜːrpɜːrə/) comes from Latin purpura, "purple", which came from ancient Greek πορφύρα. Purpura is a mass noun naming the condition or state, not the name of an individual spot (thus there is no *purpurum, *purpura or *purpura, *purpurae count declension).

== See also ==
- Bruise, which is a hematoma caused by trauma
- Purpura secondary to clotting disorders
- Purpura hemorrhagica in horses
- Pigmented purpuric dermatosis
- Schamberg disease (progressive pigmentary purpura)
