= CKDu =

CKDu or CKDU may refer to:

- Chronic kidney disease of unknown etiology
  - Mesoamerican nephropathy, a CKDu in Central America
- CKDU-FM, a campus radio station of Dalhousie University, Nova Scotia, Canada
