= UK Kidney Association =

UK professional body

The UK Kidney Association (UKKA), formerly the Renal Association, is the second oldest nephrology society in the world. The UKKA has over 1,400 doctors, scientists and multi-professional team members.

== History ==
It was founded in 1950 by Arthur Arnold Osman and first met on March 30, 1950, it is the second nephrology society in the world after the Société de Pathologie Rénale, which met in Paris in February 1949. For 71 years, the association has promoted and shared research on kidney disease.

The Renal Association established the UK Renal Registry (UKRR) in 1995. The UKRR team manage data collection, analysis and reporting on approximately 8,000 new patients, 67,000 existing patients on RRT and on about 500,000 patients with an acute kidney injury each year. Data collated from renal centres and hospital laboratories is used to improve the care of patients with kidney disease across the UK.

In 2005 the association, together with the Royal College of Physicians of London, published national guidelines on the diagnosis and management of chronic kidney disease (CKD), which led to the routine reporting of the estimated glomerular filtration rate (eGFR) by most National Health Service laboratories.

== Activities ==
The Renal Association has continued to produce clinical practice guidance on the management of patients with kidney disease since 1995. The guidelines are not funded by any external organisation, commercial company or charity. The guidelines have been accredited by the National Institute for Health and Care Excellence (NICE).

As a membership organisation, the association supports all professionals involved in the care of patients with kidney disease and works with partners to enhance education, training and research.

The association works closely with the Kidney Quality Improvement Partnership (KQuIP), the British Association of Paediatric Nephrology, the UK Renal Pharmacy Group, and RaDaR, the rare kidney disease registry.

In April 2021 the British Renal Society and the Renal Association merged to create the UK Kidney Association, a new organisation dedicated to supporting the whole multi-professional team (MPT) in the delivery of kidney care, education and research.

== See also ==
- UK National Kidney Federation
