= Arthur Arnold Osman =

British nephrologist (1893–1972)

Arthur Arnold Osman (24 May 1893 – 20 April 1972) was a British nephrologist. Osman was one of the first physicians to specialize entirely in the management of renal disorders; the first to recognize that nephrology needed to become a specialty (1930s); published profusely; the first physician to style himself a ‘nephrologist’ (1945); founded the first nephrological society in the world, the Renal Association (1950); and organized the first international meeting devoted entirely to the kidney and its diseases (1953)

Dr. Osman graduated Whitgift School and completed medical studies at Guy's Hospital in 1919. Osman was married to Rose Osman (née Rutherford) in 1936. Osman had a son, Philip, an adopted daughter, Gertrude and two grandchildren, amongst many other living relatives.

He began his career at Guy's Hospital in London but during World War II, bombing drove him to Pembury Hospital, Pembury, Kent, where he continued to work as director of the renal unit until retirement in 1957. Today the Renal Unit is dedicated to him.

He is known worldwide as the world's first nephrologist.
