= CRRT =

The abbreviation CRRT may refer to:

- Christopher Reuel Tolkien
- Carrier Route mail sorting system for the United States Postal Service
- Continuous renal replacement therapy
- Chemical-Biological-Radiological Rapid Response Team
- Commuter Rail Real Time data from the MBTA, providing train locations and arrival predictions for the MBTA Commuter Rail system
- Cyber Rapid Response Team - EU countries (Lithuania, Estonia, Croatia, Poland, the Netherlands and Romania) cooperation in cyber area
