= George Norrie, 2nd Baron Norrie =

British peer and environmentalist

The Right Honourable The Lord Norrie
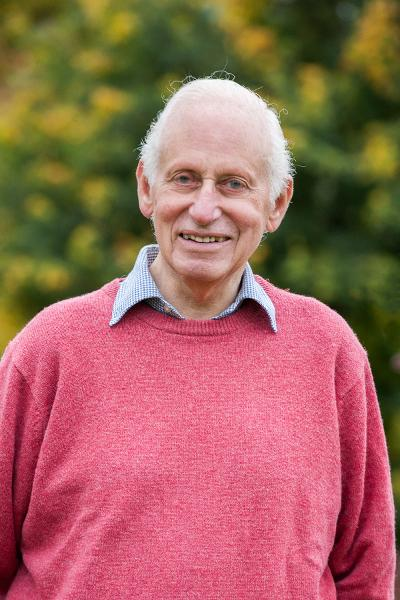

Member of the House of Lords
- Lord Temporal
- Preceded by: Charles Willougby Moke Norrie
- Succeeded by: Abolished by the House of Lords Act 1999

Personal details
- Born: George Willoughby Moke Norrie; 27 April 1936 (age 89)

George Willoughby Moke Norrie, 2nd Baron Norrie (born 27 April 1936) is a British peer and environmentalist. He piloted important legislation on national parks and statutory swimming to promote water safety for school age children. He has a long track record as a champion of the environmental voluntary sector.

== Title ==
George Norrie is the eldest son of Charles Willougby Moke Norrie, 1st Baron Norrie and former Governor of South Australia and the 8th Governor-General of New Zealand. He succeeded to the title when his father died on 25 May 1977, taking up a seat on the Conservative benches in the House of Lords.

== Early life and military career ==
Norrie was educated at Eton and the Royal Military College, Sandhurst, and was commissioned into the 11th Hussars (Prince Albert's Own) in 1956. He served in Northern Ireland, Aden as ADC to the C in C Middle East Command, Germany on regimental duty and as GSO3( Intelligence) 4th Guards Brigade. He resigned his Commission in 1970 to set up a Nursery and Garden Centre business.

== Professional life ==
=== Garden centres ===
With his Dutch business partner, Hans Overeynder, Norrie ran Fairfield Nurseries (Hermitage) Ltd, from 1970 to 1989, when the business was bought by Hilliers of Winchester Ltd. Concerns within the garden centre trade led to the topic of his maiden speech in the House of Lords on a subject that affected garden centres, calling for the reform of Sunday Trading Laws (13 March 1979). Sunday trading was finally legalised in 1994 after 26 attempts.

== Political career ==
=== House of Lords and the environment ===
In 1988 Norrie was at the forefront of getting nearly 10,000 children to enter a schools competition aimed at publicising the loss of the English elm to Dutch Elm Disease. Professor David Bellamy presented the prizes at Fairfield Nurseries and encouraged Norrie to take up the green cause in Parliament. In 1987 he became President of the British Trust for Conservation Volunteers (now The Conservation Volunteers), succeeding David Bellamy (until 2014). In 1990 he became a Vice President of The Tree Council (until 1992) and the Council of National Parks (now the Campaign for National Parks.) For 4 years from 1988 he was a member of the European Communities Select Committee (sub-committee F Environment), and contributed to various reports including its 1989 Report on Habitat and Species Protection.

=== Pioneering legislation ===
In April 1991 Norrie sponsored a Private Member's Bill on swimming and water safety on behalf of the Royal Life Saving Society (RLSS). This required schools to ensure their pupils could swim. In the 3 years up to 1991 200 children under 15 had died from drowning, 80% of them unable to swim. The bill he sponsored became law in 1994 under statutory order, meaning that since then swimming and water safety have been part of the national curriculum for physical education in England.

In 1991 a pivotal Countryside Commission report, chaired by Professor Ron Edwards, recommended a number of measures for better protection and management of the National Parks of England and Wales. “Fit for the Future” included a recommendation that National Parks should have independent authorities to run them. In the absence of Government legislation Norrie took forward a Private Member's Bill with this one aim, supported by a national campaign spearheaded by Sir Chris Bonington, President of the Council for National Parks at the time. Norrie introduced it to Parliament on 16 March 1994. The Bill ran out of time but led to the National Park clauses in the Environment Act 1995. Norrie contributed more widely to debate on measures across the wide-ranging legislation.

Norrie was instrumental in securing environmental safeguards in the passage of legislation to privatise the utilities: Water Act (3 amendments tabled and won 1989); Electricity Act (two amendments won 1989) and Coal Industry Act (one amendment 1990). In 1993 Norrie won the Green House (now Green Ribbon) Political Award in the House of Lords: “to recognise and reward the contribution made by politicians to environmental protection through their activity at Westminster and Brussels”.

=== Other voluntary sector roles ===
Norrie's son, Mark, as a teenager was diagnosed with a condition leading to kidney failure. In 1994 Norrie became involved with the National Kidney Federation, later becoming its President (until 2001). He pressed for an independent commission to explore methods of increasing organ donation (e.g. by presumed consent) which was introduced in Wales in the Human Transplantation Act 2013. In England this comes in from May 2020. And a year later in Scotland.

=== Reform of the House of Lords ===
In 1999, after 500 years, the House of Lords Act 1999 removed all but 42 Conservative hereditary Peers from their seats in the Lords. The 42 were chosen by ballot and Lord Norrie was not one of them, falling short by just one vote.

Norrie continued to work for environmental causes, like The Conservation Volunteers. His memoir, “Portals of Discovery” was published in 2016. He lives in Dumfriesshire, Scotland, and is a Patron of the Galloway National Parks Association, which aims to establish Galloway as Scotland's third National Park.

== Family ==
Norrie married his first wife Celia Marguerite Mann JP in 1964 (dissolved 1997), and has one son and two daughters. He married Pamela Ann McCaffry in 1997. The heir apparent to the title of Baron Norrie of Wellington in New Zealand and of Upton in the County of Gloucester is the Hon Mark Willoughby John Norrie, born in 1972.

== Notes ==
Peerage of the United Kingdom
Preceded by Willoughby Norrie	Baron Norrie; 1977–present Member of the House of Lords (1977–1999)	Incumbent; Heir apparent: Hon. Thomas Dugdale
