= Willoughby Norrie, 1st Baron Norrie =

British Army general and colonial administrator (1893–1977)

Lieutenant-General The Right Honourable The Lord Norrie GCMG GCVO CB DSO MC & Bar KStJ
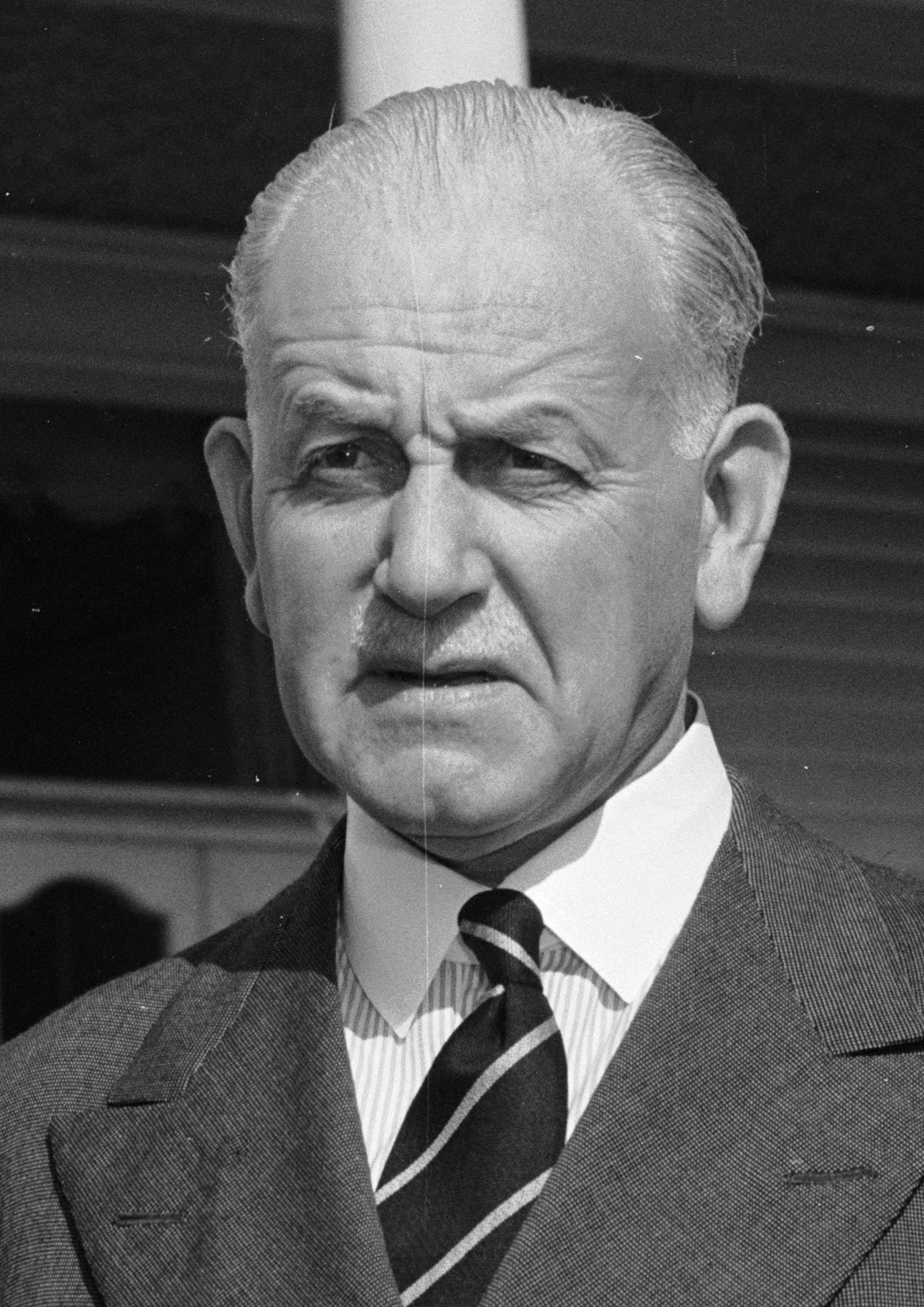
- Norrie in 1953

8th Governor-General of New Zealand
- In office 2 December 1952 – 5 July 1957
- Monarch: Elizabeth II
- Prime Minister: Sidney Holland
- Preceded by: The Lord Freyberg
- Succeeded by: The Viscount Cobham

23rd Governor of South Australia
- In office 19 December 1944 – 19 June 1952
- Monarchs: George VI; Elizabeth II
- Preceded by: Sir Malcolm Barclay-Harvey
- Succeeded by: Sir Robert George

Personal details
- Born: 26 September 1893 Brompton, London, England
- Died: 25 May 1977 (aged 83) Wantage, Oxfordshire, England

Military service
- Allegiance: United Kingdom
- Branch/service: British Army
- Years of service: 1913–1944
- Rank: Lieutenant-General
- Unit: 11th Hussars
- Commands: Commander Royal Armoured Corps (1943–1944); XXX Corps (1941–1942); 1st Armoured Division (1940–1941); 1st Armoured Brigade (1940); 1st Light Armoured Brigade (1938–1940); 1st Cavalry Brigade (1936–1938); 10th Hussars (1931–1935)
- Battles/wars: First World War; Second World War
- Awards: Knight Grand Cross of the Order of St Michael and St George; Knight Grand Cross of the Royal Victorian Order; Companion of the Order of the Bath; Distinguished Service Order; Military Cross & Bar; Knight of the Venerable Order of St John; Mentioned in despatches (2)

Lieutenant-General Charles Willoughby Moke Norrie, 1st Baron Norrie, GCMG, GCVO, CB, DSO, MC & Bar, KStJ (26 September 1893 – 25 May 1977) was a senior officer of the British Army who fought in both World Wars, following which he served terms as Governor of South Australia and the eighth Governor-General of New Zealand.

== Military career ==
=== Early career and First World War ===
Educated at Eton College and at the Royal Military College, Sandhurst, he was commissioned as a second lieutenant into the British Army's 11th Hussars in 1913. He served in the First World War, in which he was awarded the Distinguished Service Order, the Military Cross and Bar, was twice mentioned in despatches, and was wounded four times. He became, successively, a staff captain in the 73rd Brigade; general staff officer grade 3 (GSO3) in XVIII Corps; brigade major in the 90th Brigade, and in the 2nd Tank Brigade; and second GSO in the 2nd Battalion, Tank Corps. In January 1919 he changed his name by deed poll from Moke-Norrie to Norrie.

=== Between the wars ===
Between the world wars Norrie had a number of regimental and staff postings, interrupted by a year at the Staff College, Camberley in 1924. In 1931 he was promoted to lieutenant colonel and became commanding officer (CO) of the 10th Hussars, after which he was placed on the half-pay (inactive) list although promoted to full colonel in 1935. In January 1936, still on the half pay list, Norrie took part in the funeral procession for King George V as one of the "Representative Colonels-Commandant and Colonels of His late Majesty's Regiments". After attending the Imperial Defence College, in April 1936 he was appointed to command the 1st Cavalry Brigade as a temporary brigadier. His brigade was mechanised in 1938 and re-designated 1st Light Armoured Brigade, becoming the 1st Armoured Brigade in 1940.

=== Second World War ===
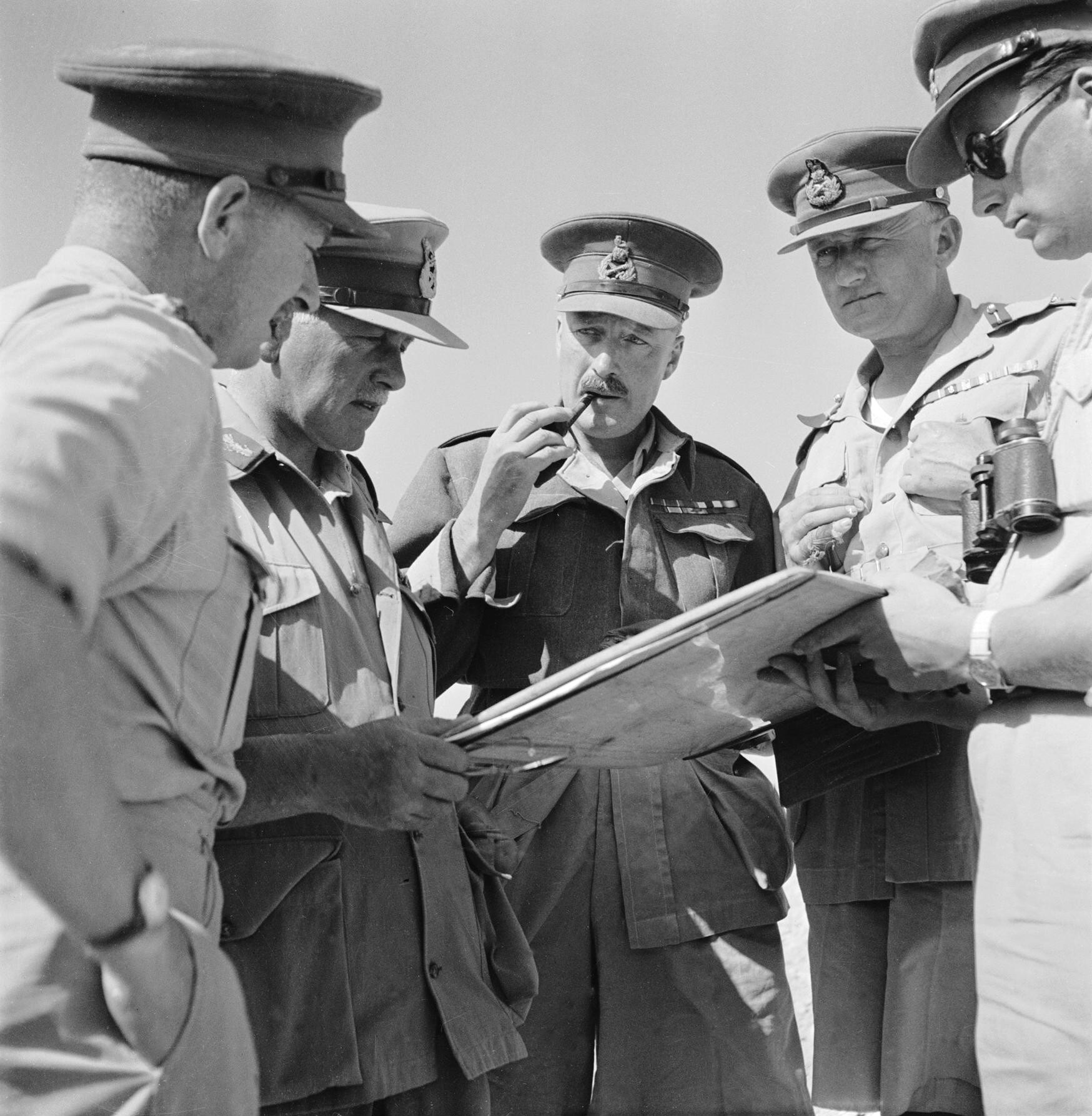
The GOC Eighth Army, Lieutenant-General Neil Ritchie (centre, with pipe) addressing other officers in North Africa, 31 May 1942. Also pictured are Lieutenant-General Willoughby Norrie, GOC XXX Corps, and William Gott, GOC XIII Corps.

On the outbreak of the Second World War Norrie continued to serve as commander of the 1st Armoured Brigade. In April 1940 the brigade was part of the 2nd Armoured Division, which he was given temporary command of for a month between appointments of permanent commanders. Following this he was appointed acting major general and became Inspector of the Royal Armoured Corps. Four months later he became general officer commanding (GOC) of the 1st Armoured Division and was promoted to the permanent rank of major general in June 1941.

In November 1941 the division was ordered to Egypt where Norrie found himself appointed acting lieutenant general to command XXX Corps in the place of Vyvyan Pope, Norrie's fellow student at the Staff College in the 1920s, who had died in an air crash shortly before Norrie's arrival in Egypt. He commanded XXX Corps during Operation Crusader with some success but his tanks suffered a heavy defeat at the Battle of Gazala in June 1942. He was criticised for his "cavalry" approach to armoured warfare and General Sir Claude Auchinleck, the Eighth Army commander, replaced him in July.

He returned to Britain to be appointed commander of the Royal Armoured Corps, in which role he was to give advice on armoured warfare to General Bernard Paget, the Commander-in-Chief, Home Forces. He continued as Paget's advisor when Paget became commander of the Anglo-Canadian 21st Army Group on its formation in July 1943 but when General Bernard Montgomery assumed command early in 1944, he brought his own advisor. In April 1944 Norrie was appointed gead of the military mission to the French Committee of National Liberation (CFLN) in Algiers, a post he held until the middle of 1944, when he was proposed by the secretary of state for the Dominions to become Governor of South Australia.

Norrie retired from the British Army in September 1944 to take up his post as Governor of South Australia. Although his substantive rank at this time was still major general, he was given the honorary rank of lieutenant general in retirement.

== Family ==
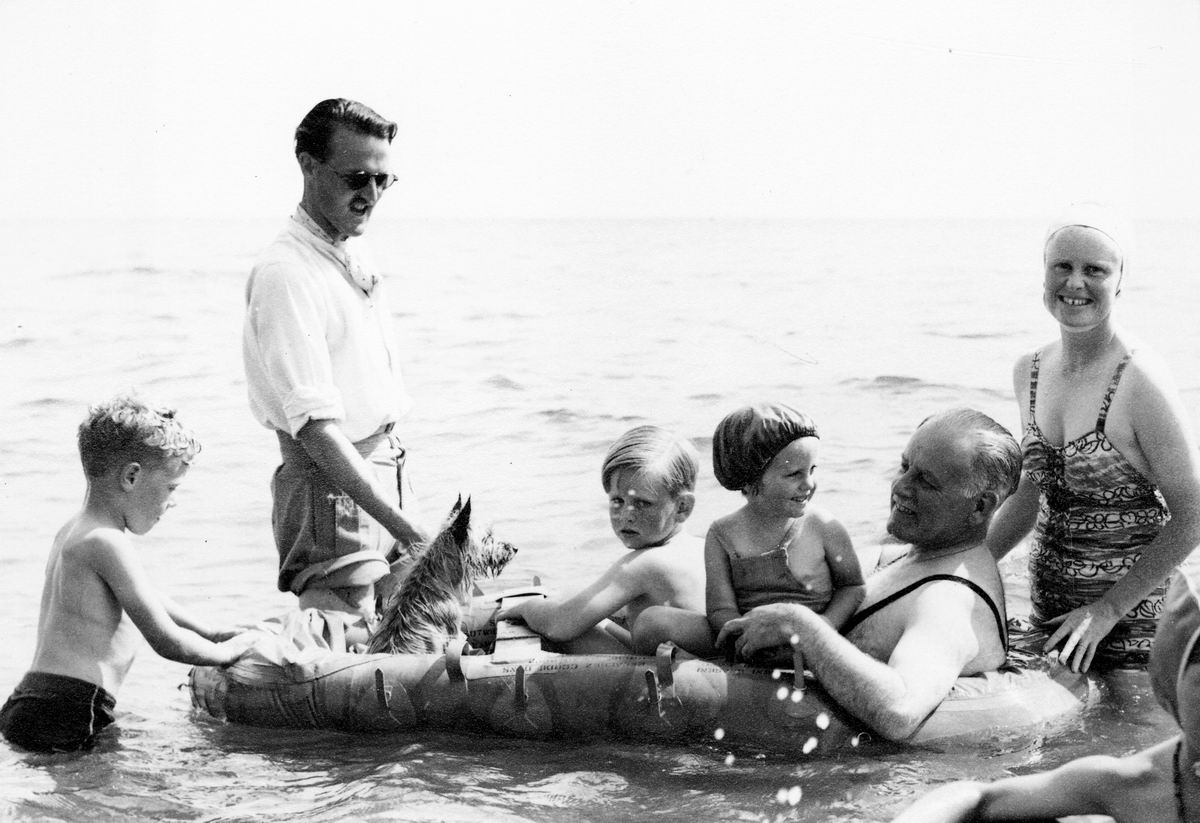
Norrie (in dinghy) and his family, with Captain Farebrother, ADC (standing, left) at Henley Beach, South Australia, December 1946

Norrie was married to Jocelyn Helen Gosling on 9 June 1922. They had three children: Diana Norrie (7 May 1923 – 6 December 1932); Hon. Rosemary Norrie (born 28 March 1926), who married the 3rd Viscount Daventry; and George Willoughby Moke Norrie (born 27 April 1936).

Jocelyn Norrie died on 7 March 1938. Norrie then married, on 28 November that year, Patricia Merryweather Bainbridge, daughter of Emerson Bainbridge. They also had three children: Guy Bainbridge Norrie (born 3 May 1940), Sarah Norrie (born 27 June 1943), and Annabel Mary Adelaide Norrie (born 23 December 1945).

Norrie also had a ward, his niece Eleanor Kerans (born 21 April 1926). She had been orphaned at an early age; when she was 16 her brother was killed in the Western Desert campaign of the Second World War, leaving her with no immediate family.

== Governor of South Australia ==
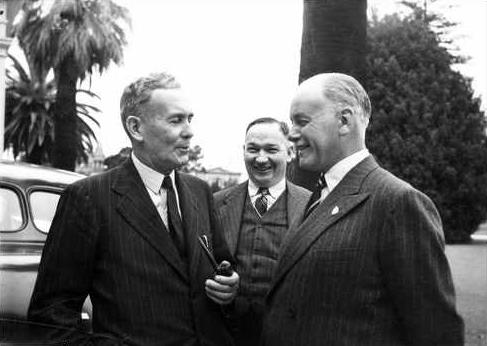
Norrie (right) with Prime Minister Ben Chifley (left) and Premier of South Australia Tom Playford (centre)

Norrie was appointed Governor of South Australia in September 1944, whereupon he was knighted as a Knight Commander of the Order of St Michael and St George (KCMG). He, his family and 12 staff arrived in Adelaide in December. The Vice-Regal couple worked hard to keep the 'Empire Spirit' alive during wartime. Within two years, Norrie had travelled to every local government area within the state, and was sure to welcome servicemen returning from war. Lady Patricia, with Rosemary and Eleanor, were regular volunteers and champions of various patriotic causes. In 1945, Norrie was made a Knight of St John, an award associated with public and charitable works.

Although normally remaining neutral in regards to local politics, he was 'shocked' at the narrow rejection of Thomas Playford's bill to nationalise the Adelaide Electric Company. He privately exerted pressure on the bill's main opponents. When the bill was reintroduced in 1946, Collier Cudmore (later Sir Collier) absented himself from key divisions, allowing the bill to pass and leading to the establishment of the Electricity Trust of South Australia.

Norrie's term was extended for four years in 1948. Despite his illustrious career, he claimed that his greatest achievement was the catching of a shark weighing 2,225 pounds (1,009 kg), with rod and reel, off Port Lincoln. For part of his term as governor, his official aide-de-camp was the young Viscount Althorp (later The 8th Earl Spencer), the father of Diana, Princess of Wales.

== Governor-General of New Zealand ==
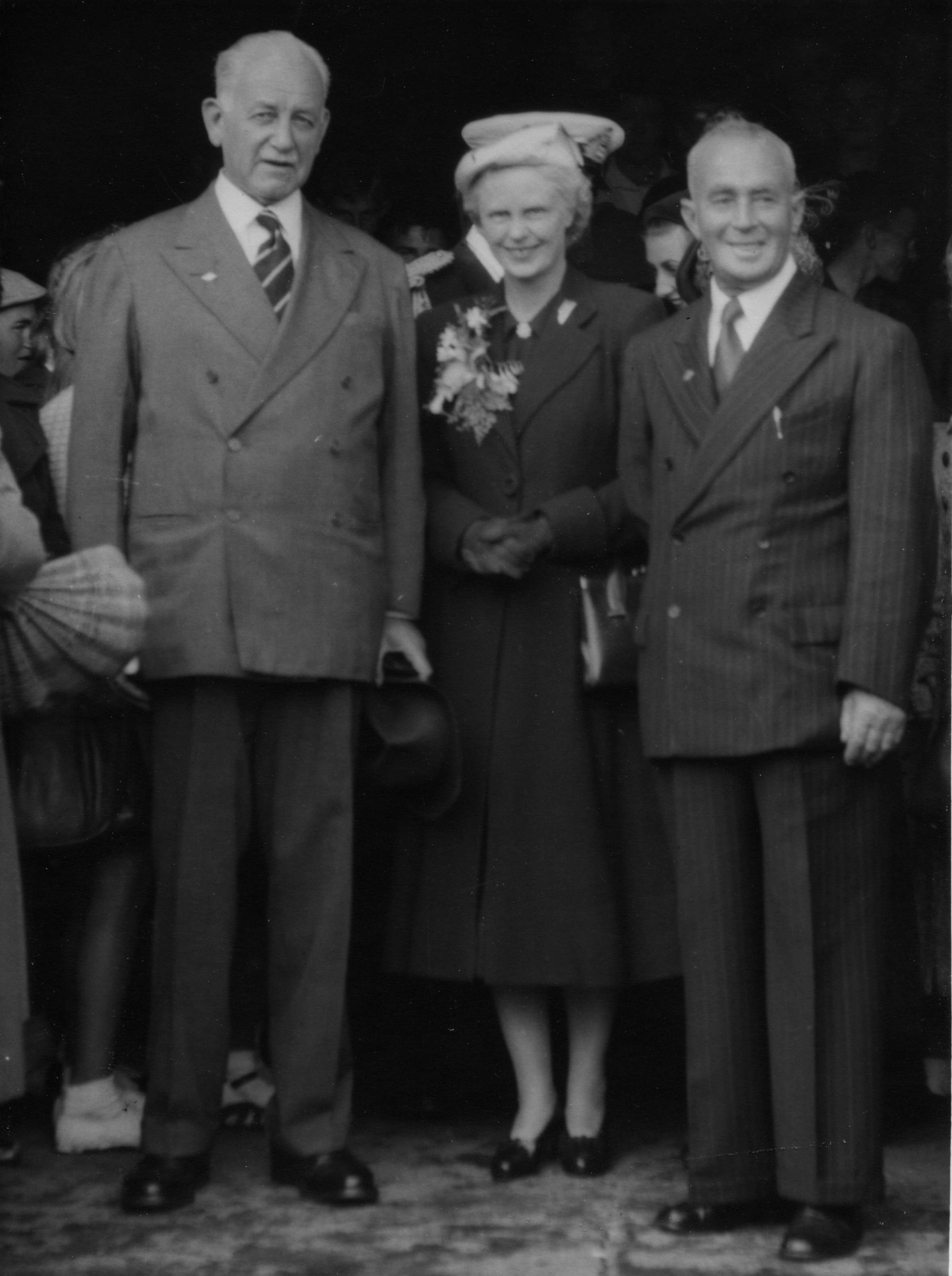
Sir Willoughby and Lady Norrie with Mayor H. H. Podmore during a visit to Foxton, New Zealand, April 1954

Norrie's KCMG was promoted to Knight Grand Cross of the Order of St Michael and St George (GCMG) when he was appointed Governor-General of New Zealand in 1952, in which position he served until 1957. During his tenure he was awarded the Queen Elizabeth II Coronation Medal in 1953, and appointed a Knight Grand Cross of the Royal Victorian Order (GCVO) for personal services to The Queen. On leaving office, he was created a peer in 1957 as Baron Norrie, of Wellington in the Dominion of New Zealand and of Upton in the County of Gloucester. From 1960 to 1968 he was Chancellor of the Order of Saint Michael and Saint George.

== Styles ==
Note: An asterisk (*) denotes a bar to a military award

- 1893–1913: Charles Willoughby Moke Norrie
- 1913–1915: Lieutenant Charles Willoughby Moke Norrie
- 1915–1917: Lieutenant Charles Willoughby Moke Norrie, MC
- 1917–1918: Lieutenant Charles Willoughby Moke Norrie, MC*
- 1918–1919: Captain Charles Willoughby Moke Norrie, MC*
- 1919–1924: Captain Charles Willoughby Moke Norrie, DSO, MC*
- 1924–1931: Major Charles Willoughby Moke Norrie, DSO, MC*
- 1931–1935: Lieutenant-Colonel Charles Willoughby Moke Norrie, DSO, MC*
- 1935–1938: Colonel Charles Willoughby Moke Norrie, DSO, MC*
- 1938–1940: Colonel (Temp. Brigadier) Charles Willoughby Moke Norrie, DSO, MC*
- 1940 – June 1941: Colonel (Actg. Major-General) Charles Willoughby Moke Norrie, DSO, MC*
- June–September 1941: Major-General Charles Willoughby Moke Norrie, DSO, MC*
- September 1941 – 1942: Major-General (Actg. Lieutenant-General) Charles Willoughby Moke Norrie, DSO, MC*
- 1942–1944: Major-General (Actg. Lieutenant-General) Charles Willoughby Moke Norrie, CB, DSO, MC*
- 1944–1952: Lieutenant-General Sir Charles Willoughby Moke Norrie, KCMG, CB, DSO, MC*
- 1952–1954: Lieutenant-General Sir Charles Willoughby Moke Norrie, GCMG, CB, DSO, MC*
- 1954–1957: Lieutenant-General Sir Charles Willoughby Moke Norrie, GCMG, GCVO, CB, DSO, MC*
- 1957–1977: Lieutenant-General The Right Honourable the Lord Norrie, GCMG, GCVO, CB, DSO, MC*

== Arms ==
Coat of arms of Willoughby Norrie, 1st Baron Norrie
Notes The arms of Charles Norrie consist of: (Carved depiction) Crest Dexter, an elephant's head erased sable, tusked argent, supporting with the trunk a garb or (Norrie). Sinister, stag's head couped, holding in the mouth a branch of poplar proper, between the attired a key as in the arms pendant from a chain or (Moke). Escutcheon Quarterly: 1st and 4th, Ermine, on a pale Gules three helmets Argent (Norrie); 2nd and 3rd, Or, on a chevron Azure between two poplar trees eradicated in chief Proper, and a mullet of six points in base Azure, a key the wards downwards Or (Moke). Supporters On either side a dark bay racehorse supporting between the forelegs a frond of New Zealand fern Proper. Motto Deus nobis providet (God provides for us)

== Notes ==
Military offices
Preceded by Roger Evans	GOC 1st Armoured Division; 1940–1941	Succeeded by Herbert Lumsden
Preceded by Vyvyan Pope	GOC XXX Corps; 1941–1942	Succeeded by William Ramsden
Government offices
Preceded by Sir Malcolm Barclay-Harvey	Governor of South Australia; 1944–1952	Succeeded by Sir Robert George
Honorary titles
Preceded by Victor Greenwood	Colonel of the 10th Royal Hussars (Prince of Wales's Own); 1947–1949	Succeeded by Sir Charles Gairdner
Government offices
Preceded by The Lord Freyberg	Governor-General of New Zealand; 1952–1957	Succeeded by The Viscount Cobham
Peerage of the United Kingdom
New creation	Baron Norrie; 1957–1977	Succeeded by George Norrie
