= Norman Daniels =

American philosopher and political theorist (born 1942)

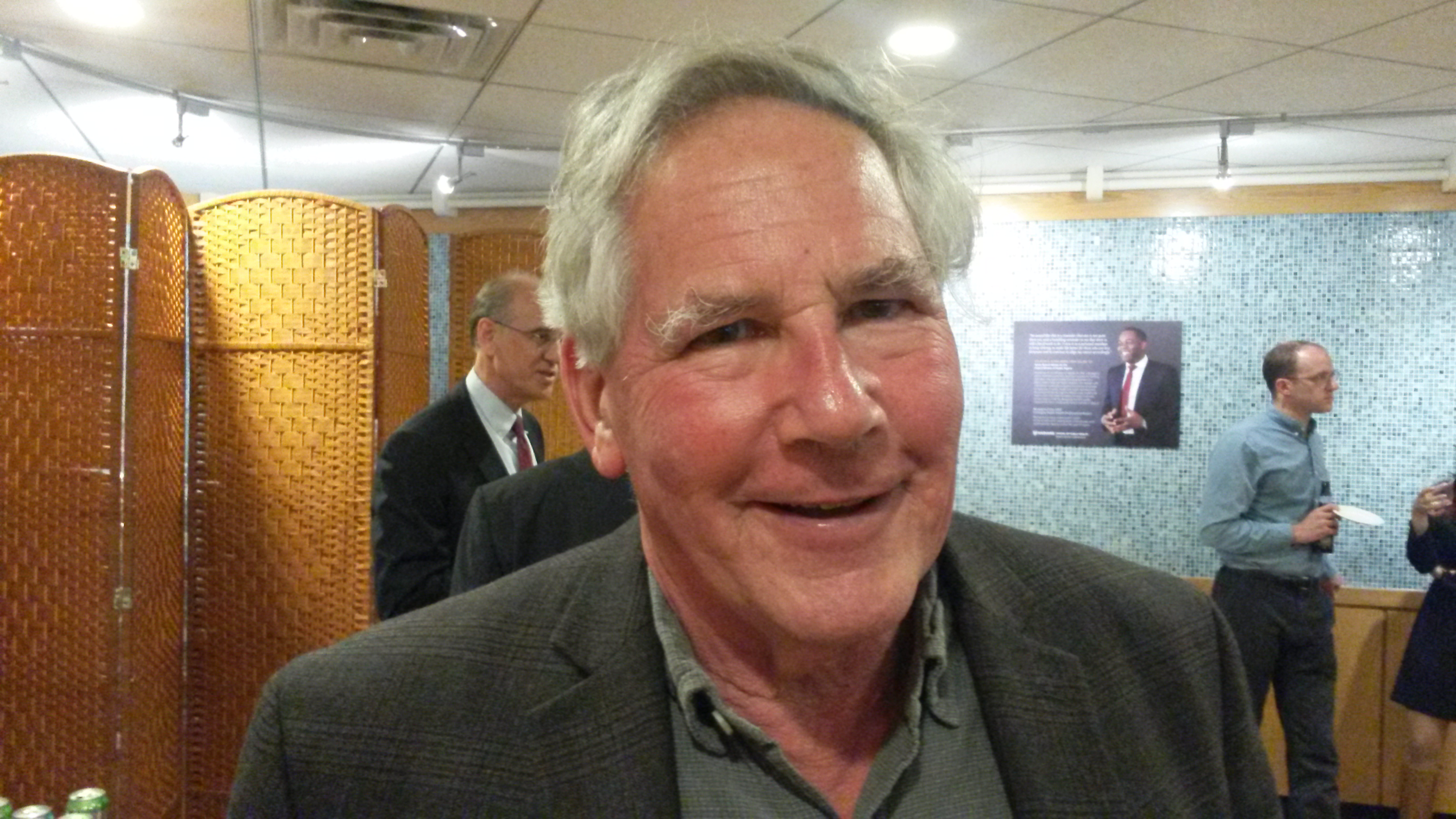
- Norman Daniels at 5-22-2017 HCSPH Retirement Symposium
- Born: 1942 (age 83–84); New York
- Known for: A theory of justice which includes health possibilities and healthcare ethics
- Awards: Investigator Award in Health Policy Research, Robert Wood Johnson Foundation
- Scientific career
- Fields: Global health, population health, health ethics, philosophy, ethics
- Workplaces: Tufts University, Tufts University School of Medicine, Harvard School of Public Health, Harvard University

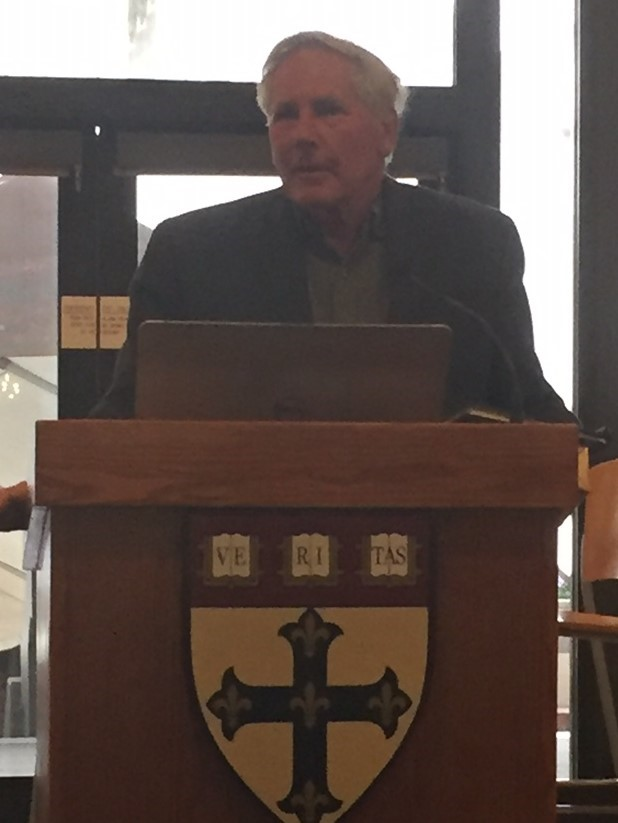
Normal Daniels speaking at a retirement party.

Norman Daniels (born 1942) is an American political philosopher and philosopher of science, political theorist, ethicist, and bioethicist at Harvard University and the Harvard T.H. Chan School of Public Health. Before his career at Harvard, Daniels had built his career as a medical ethicist at Tufts University in Medford, Massachusetts, and at Tufts University School of Medicine, also in Boston. He also developed the concept of accountability for reasonableness with James Sabin, an ethics framework used to challenge the healthcare resource allocation in the 1990s.

== Teaching positions ==
Until his retirement at the end of June 2017, Daniels was Mary B. Saltonstall Professor of Population Ethics and Professor of Ethics and Population Health in the Department of Global Health and Population at the Harvard T.H. Chan School of Public Health in Boston.

Previously, and for 33 years, he had taught political philosophy at Tufts University in Medford, Massachusetts. At Tufts University, he had been Goldthwaite Professor and chair of the philosophy department, and at Tufts University School of Medicine, he was professor of medical ethics (1969–2002).

== Education ==
- 1970 - Harvard University, Ph.D. (Philosophy), awarded the Plympton Dissertation Prize, 1971
- 1966 - Balliol College, Oxford, B.A. (equivalent to M.A. in USA) (Philosophy and Psychology, First Honors)
- 1964 - Wesleyan University, B.A. (English, Summa cum Laude)

== Personal life ==
Daniels is married to neuro-psychologist Anne Lacy Daniels (Ed.D.). They have one son, Noah M. Daniels (Ph.D), currently an Associate Professor in the Department of Computer Science and Statistics of The University of Rhode Island.

With Jared Israel, Daniels co-chaired the Harvard chapter of the Students for a Democratic Society in 1969.

In a public letter to his fraternity brothers at Wesleyan, Daniels wrote: "At Harvard, I ended up co-chair of SDS and gave the speech on the steps of University Hall April 9, 1969, that began the take-over of that administration building and thus led to the Harvard Strike. I would have been fired as a teaching fellow, so I followed my advisors advice and quit that position to take a part-time job at Tufts, teaching philosophy of science and political philosophy. I stayed 33 years."

== Professional affiliations ==
- Formerly Goldthwaite Professor and chair of the philosophy department at Tufts University and professor of medical ethics at Tufts Medical School, 1969–2002
- Fellow, Hastings Center
- Member, Institute of Medicine
- Founding member of the National Academy of Social Insurance
- Member, International Society for Equity in Health
- Member, Medicare Coverage Advisory Commission (Bill Clinton administration)
- Member, Ethics Working Group of the Clinton White House Health Care Task Force (Spring 1993)
- Member, Advisory Board of the CIHR-Institute of Population and Public Health (Fall 2009)
- Member, Ethics Advisory Board of the Centers for Disease Control (Fall 2009 - Fall 2012)
- Member, Public Health Service Expert Panel on Cost Effectiveness and Clinical Preventive Medicine
- Member, National Academy of Social Insurance study panel on the social role of Medicare
- Member, Century Fund task force on Medicare reform

Consulting

- He has traveled widely and internationally, consulting with organizations, commissions, and governments in the U.S. and abroad on issues of justice and health policy
- Norman Daniels and Dan W. Brock consulted with Hillary Clinton on Bill Clinton's healthcare taskforce in 1993.
- Consultant, United Nations
- Consultant, World Health Organization
- President's Commission for the Study of Ethical Problems in Medicine

== Awards ==
- Member, Institute of Medicine
- Fellow, The Hastings Center
- Founding Member, National Academy of Social Insurance
- Founding Member, International Society for Equity in Health
- Founding Member, National Cancer Policy Board, established by the Institute of Medicine and the Commission on the Life Sciences (served He served four years)
- Founding Member, Advisory Board of the Open Society Foundation project on Medicine as a Profession, and on the International Bioethics Advisory Board of PAHO. He served recently on an IOM Committee on the use of Cost Effectiveness Analysis in regulatory contexts.

== Fellowships and grants ==
- Greenwall Foundation
- National Endowment for the Humanities
- National Institutes of Health
- National Library of Medicine
- National Science Foundation
- Retirement Research Foundation
- Robert Wood Johnson Foundation

Investigator Award in Health Policy Research, Robert Wood Johnson Foundation, 1997 (for the period 1998-2001)
"Limit-Setting in Managed Care and Other Health Delivery Systems: Legitimacy, Fair Process, and the Goals of Health Care Reform"

- Rockefeller Foundation grant, international adaptation of the benchmarks

== Books ==
- Thomas Reid's`Inquiry': the Geometry of Visibles and the Case for Realism (1974; Stanford, 1989)
- Reading Rawls: Critical Studies on Rawls' 'A Theory of Justice' (1975; Stanford, 1989)
- Just Health Care (Cambridge, 1985)
- Am I My Parents' Keeper? An Essay on Justice Between the Young and the Old (Oxford, 1988)
- Seeking Fair Treatment: From the AIDS Epidemic to National Health Care Reform (New York: Oxford University Press, 1995)
- Justice and Justification: Reflective Equilibrium in Theory and Practice (Cambridge University Press, 1996)
- (with Donald Light and Ronald Caplan) Benchmarks of Fairness for Health Care Reform (Oxford, 1996)
- (with Allen Buchanan, Dan Brock, and Dan Wikler) From Chance to Choice: Genetics and Justice. Cambridge University Press. ISBN 0-521-66977-4. (Cambridge, 2000)
- (with Bruce Kennedy and Ichiro Kawachi) Is Inequality Bad for Our Health? (Beacon Press, 2000)
- (with Harvard Medical School clinical ethicist and psychiatrist James E. Sabin, MD) Setting Limits Fairly: Can We Learn to Share Medical Resources? (Oxford, 2002;2nd ed., 2008; Published to Oxford Scholarship Online: September 2009) ISBN 9780195149364. doi:10.1093/acprof:oso/9780195149364.001.0001
- Just Health: Meeting Health Needs Fairly (Cambridge, 2008).

[Source: Bibliography of books, from personal webpage, which also includes peer-reviewed journal articles and book chapters published since 1965]

== See also ==
- American philosophy
- Clinton health care plan of 1993
- List of American philosophers
- List of Jewish American philosophers
- Thomas Reid, Scottish common sense realist
