= Accountability for reasonableness =

Ethical framework for decision making

Accountability for reasonableness (A4R) is an ethical framework that describes the conditions of a fair decision-making process. It focuses on how decisions should be made and why these decisions are ethical. It was developed by Norman Daniels and James Sabin and is often applied in health policy and bioethics.

The concept of accountability for reasonableness emphasises that decision-making processes should be fair, transparent, and inclusive when making decisions about the allocation of limited healthcare resources, such as funding for medical treatments, medical services, or health programs.

Accountability for reasonableness enables the education of all stakeholders regarding fair decision-making under resource constraints. This approach navigates a middle path between proponents of "explicit" and "implicit" rationing. It fosters social learning about limitations and establishes a link between healthcare institutional decisions and broader democratic deliberative processes. As it does not mandate pre-established rationing principles like implicit approaches, it requires transparent reasoning that all parties will eventually be able to acknowledge as relevant.

== Factors ==
The theory notes, to consider with accountability for reasonableness is to consider the following four conditions:

1. Relevance: The decision-making criteria and factors considered should be relevant to the goals and values of the affected stakeholders, such as patients, healthcare providers, and the community.
2. Publicity: The decision-making process should be transparent, and the reasons for the decisions made should be made publicly available. This helps ensure that the process is open to scrutiny and accountability.
3. Revisions and appeals: There should be a mechanism for challenging decisions and allowing for revisions or appeals. This enables stakeholders to question decisions that they believe are unjust or unreasonable.
4. Enforcement: There should be an enforcement mechanism to ensure that decisions are followed through and implemented as intended.

== Uses ==
In healthcare, accountability for reasonableness has been applied to the fair allocation of scarce and costly resources, including organ transplantation and renal replacement therapy. The framework emphasizes transparent reasoning, public justification, and mechanisms for appeal, thereby helping clinicians and policymakers make difficult choices when budgets are limited.

In education, the approach has been used to guide policies for the equitable distribution of funding across schools and districts. By requiring that decisions be made with clear rationales and open access to information, it supports both fairness and responsible management of limited public budgets.

== Criticism ==
The theory has been criticised for poorly distinguishing between relevant and irrelevant grounds for making decisions and for being unclear on explaining how the theory improves fairness in healthcare.
