= Mesoamerican nephropathy =

- Other names: Chronic Kidney Disease of Nontraditional Causes (CKDnt), Chronic Kidney Disease of Unknown Etiology / Uncertain Cause (CKDu), Creatinina (colloquial)
- Specialty: Nephrology

Mesoamerican nephropathy (MeN) is an endemic, non-diabetic, non-hypertensive chronic kidney disease (CKD) characterized by reduced glomerular filtration rate (GFR) with mild or no proteinuria and no features of known primary glomerular diseases. MeN is prevalent in agricultural communities along the Pacific Ocean coastal lowlands Mesoamerica, including southern Mexico, Guatemala, El Salvador, Nicaragua, Honduras and Costa Rica. Although most cases have been described among agricultural workers, MeN has also been described in other occupations, including miners, brick manufacturers, and fishermen. A common denominator among these occupations is that they are outdoor workers who reside in rural areas in hot and humid climates.

The MeN epidemic in Central America extends along a nearly 1000 kilometer stretch of the Pacific coast. Among the countries that this span encompasses, CKD is the second leading cause of death in El Salvador and Nicaragua, third leading cause in Costa Rica, and fourth leading cause in Panama. El Salvador and Nicaragua have the highest rates of kidney disease mortality in the world; among men, the mortality rate from CKD is approximately six-fold higher in El Salvador and five-fold higher in Nicaragua than the median global rate, and 1.5-2 times higher than the rate in Libya, the third-highest country on the list. The disease has devastated many of the communities where it exists and has overwhelmed healthcare systems in affected countries, causing unknown morbidity and tens of thousands of deaths over the last 20 years in Mesoamerica alone.

MeN is generally diagnosed in men in their twenties or thirties, and initially presents as a progressive decline in GFR without notable proteinuria. Traditional risk factors for CKD, including hypertension and diabetes mellitus, are generally absent. Despite international research efforts, the specific causes of the disease remain unknown, creating an enormous need for research, patient care and socioeconomic interventions that can only be appropriately addressed through international and interdisciplinary collaboration.

The term Mesoamerican Nephropathy has been in use in Central America and Mexico since 2012. Similar epidemics have been identified in both Sri Lanka and India, leading to the use of other terms that are not geographically specific, including Chronic Kidney Disease of unknown etiology (CKDu) or of non-traditional origin (CKDnt) and Chronic Interstitial Nephritis in Agricultural Communities (CINAC). Although the diseases are clinically similar and affect similar populations in each country, whether these are all manifestations of the same disease or different diseases with superficial resemblance remains to be definitively demonstrated. High prevalence of CKD with similar characteristics to MeN may exist outside of Mesoamerica, India, and Sri Lanka, although evidence so far is limited to small studies and clinician reports.

== Causes ==
Although many factors have been proposed as the cause of MeN, most attention has focused on heat stress due to a combination of strenuous work in a hot climate with insufficient hydration. Additional postulated contributing exposures include agrochemicals, metals, and pathogens. These factors are themselves a result of global and national economic and political systems that have led to poverty and social stratification. Discovery of the causes of MeN has been complicated by the fact that there are likely multiple factors that arise from different sources of exposure and/or different times of life. Until recently, progress has also been slowed by a lack of research funding, although more support has become available as awareness of the disease and its toll on the population has increased.

A review published in the New England Journal of Medicine in 2019 summarizes a proposed mechanism in which heat exposure leads to dehydration and volume depletion and/or an increase in core temperature, which may cause kidney injury directly through tissue dysfunction or indirectly through hyperosmolarity or rhabdomyolysis. Similarly, it is possible that chronic sub-clinical undetected AKI leads to eventual CKD. Another proposed mechanism is increased kidney tubular toxin uptake resulting in direct tubular toxicity, which might also be amplified by heat-associated dehydration. Genetic factors are also likely to play a role. Regardless of what mechanisms are eventually proven to be involved, researchers agree that preventive measures should include measures to ensure safe drinking water, adequate hydration, rest, and shade for workers at risk, as well as to reduce exposure to toxins. A review of the state of knowledge on potential causes and mechanisms as of 2019 can be found in a summary of the Third International Workshop on Chronic Kidney Disease of Uncertain/Non-Traditional Etiology in Mesoamerica and Other Regions on Chronic Kidney Disease of Unknown Etiology held in March 2019.

=== Heat stress, dehydration and disturbances in water and mineral balance. ===
Heat strain and dehydration is in the spotlight globally due to emerging evidence of their association with adverse renal health issues including chronic kidney disease, especially in working populations. The probability of heat stress is greater when the temperature of the environment surpasses a person's core temperature, a situation common for outdoor workers in tropical settings where temperatures can easily surpass 37 °C.

Although the specific mechanism by which heat, dehydration and workload contribute to the causal pathway for MeN remains to be definitively established, the association with MeN has been shown repeatedly. Epidemiological studies in Central America have reported adverse heat stress impacts in agricultural workers, particularly those in the sugarcane industry. In addition to exposure to high temperatures, evidence exists that high sweat rates and limited fluid intake can lead to functional and sub-clinical acute kidney injuries (AKI), and that repetitive AKI may lead to the development of CKD.

A well-conducted study on the relationship between workload and incidence of kidney injury in a fieldworker cohort with different levels of physically demanding work over a sugarcane harvest in Nicaragua was published in October 2019. The results provide evidence of dose-effect as well as dose-response relations between high-heat and high workload exposure and both increased episodes of incident acute kidney injury as well as progressive decline in GFR. The role of heat stress in the etiology of MeN is further supported by intervention studies showing mitigation of kidney function decline with efforts to improve rest, hydration, and access to shade among high-risk agricultural workers. Finally, evidence from animal models suggests a potential mechanism or mechanisms for how heat stress may drive development of MeN.

=== Agrochemicals ===
Agrochemicals like paraquat have been frequently been proposed as a potential cause or contributor to the development of MeN, although the epidemiological and pathophysiologic evidence is somewhat limited and contradictory. The main limitations of both positive and negative studies remain poor specificity and quantification of pesticide exposure, as well as the cross-sectional nature of most studies and issues with confounding and selection bias. No study has directly investigated interactions between pesticides and other concomitant exposures in agricultural occupations, in particular heat stress and dehydration. Thus, existing studies provide scarce evidence for an association between pesticides and regional MeN epidemics, but a role of nephrotoxic agrochemicals nevertheless should not be conclusively discarded.

=== Exposure to metals ===
Exposure to metals such as cadmium, lead, nickel, and mercury has also been proposed as a cause or contributor to MeN, again with limited and contradictory evidence. A number of well conducted studies have shown no association with the development of MeN, although a 2020 case–control study found an association with nickel exposure. There may be regional variation with respect to the role of heavy metals, which appear unlikely to be an important contributor in Mesoamerica but which remain under more active investigation in India and Sri Lanka.

=== Alcohol and self-medication ===
Alcohol consumption, including consumption of home-brewed alcohol, as well as self-medication with NSAIDS and other nephrotoxic medications occurs in populations affected by MeN. To what extent such exposures contribute to the epidemic of MeN is not known, as evidence is again contradictory. Some studies have described an association between NSAID use or consumption of a home-brewed alcohol called "lija" and MeN, whereas others have found limited evidence that either is an important risk factor.

=== Infectious causes ===
The high density of infectious disease vectors and reservoirs, in the context of limited access to clean water, limited resources for detecting and controlling infectious disease outbreaks, and the continued emergence of new pathogens and pathogen variants, is an important consideration when addressing kidney health in tropical and low-resource settings. The presence of these factors in MeN burdened regions lend credence to the hypothesis of an infectious etiology, and there is some evidence in support of infection as a risk factor. However, other published studies investigating infectious agents as a causal factor in MeN have been negative. There may again exist regional variation between Mesoamerica and India / Sri Lanka with respect to the role of infectious causes in CKD development.

== Diagnosis ==
A challenging feature of MeN is that, because the pathophysiology of disease remains relatively poorly understood, the case definition remains broad and likely will include many cases of undiagnosed kidney diseases that ultimately prove to be unrelated to MeN. Recent efforts to provide a case definition have focused on the following features:

- Suspected disease:
  - Estimated GFR (eGFR) < 60 ml/min/1.73m^{2}
  - Absence of diabetes, hypertension, autoimmune disease, glomerular disease, congenital kidney disease, obstructive kidney disease as a clear cause of kidney disease (these comorbidities may be present but cannot account for disease development)
  - Residing in a hotspot region
  - Proteinuria < 2g/24h or 2g/g urine creatinine
- Likely disease: All of the above, plus
  - eGFR < 60 ml/min/1.73m^{2} on 3 month or longer repeat measurement
  - Relative hypokalemia and/or hyperuricemia
  - Kidney ultrasound with loss of corticomedullary differentiation or bilateral small kidney size, without cystic disease or large stone burden
  - Kidney biopsy showing primary tubulointerstitial disease without alternative cause of kidney disease in evidence

This case definition may not be as useful for disease outside of Mesoamerica; while there are many similarities between clinical aspects of CKDu in India, Sri Lanka, and MeN in Mesoamerica, there are some important differences as well. Individuals affected in Mesoamerica are younger (aged 20–40 as opposed to 20–60 at the age of onset of CKD). Both regions demonstrate a high male-to-female ratio and significant familial concordance, but the degree of male predominance appears to be greater in Mesoamerica. Most affected individuals in both regions live in rural poverty and work in occupations involving physical labor, including agriculture, fishing, and aquaculture. Hypokalemia, hyponatremia, minimal proteinuria, and sterile pyuria are highly prevalent. Individuals in Mesoamerica often have hyperuricemia and urate crystalluria, but this is observed less frequently India or Sri Lanka, .

Kidney biopsy in individuals with MeN demonstrates some consistent features across regions. Biopsies are generally chronic glomerular and tubulointerstitial damage with glomerulosclerosis and chronic glomerular ischemia, without positive findings on immunofluorescence or definitive evidence of primary glomerular lesions. Glomerular enlargement may be observed. Ultrastructural changes evaluated with electron microscopy were mostly consistent with the light microscopic observations. Large dysmorphic lysosomes within tubular epithelial cells have been proposed as a distinctive feature but at present are not considered pathognomonic. In kidney biopsies from individuals with acute kidney injury (AKI) among high-risk patients for MeN, considered possibly a contributing stage to disease, the main findings were described as tubulointerstitial nephritis with varying degrees of acute inflammation and chronic tubulointerstitial changes. In some cases, neutrophils have been found in the tubular lumen of both chronic and acute MeN/CKDu patients, but urine cultures from these patients have been negative.

== Treatment ==
No standard guidelines for the management of MeN patients exist, and treatment strategies employed by health care providers vary widely. Based on clinical consensus from the most recent CENCAM meeting, no specific treatment exists beyond improving access to shade, hydration, and rest among individuals engaging in work that places them at risk for heat stress, as well as emphasizing access to clean air and water and avoidance of nephrotoxic substances. Care of advanced CKD due to MeN should likely be similar to that employed in advanced CKD of other causes. There are anecdotal reports of response to allopurinol (in response to elevated uric acid levels), corticosteroids (in response to acute tubulointerstitial nephritis on kidney biopsy), and use of angiotensin converting enzyme inhibitors (ACEIs) and angiotensin II receptor blockers (ARBs), but the consensus is that there is insufficient evidence to support any of these therapies.

== Prognosis ==
Evidence regarding the prognosis when MeN remains limited. One study suggests that there is substantial variety in progression of disease, with some individuals having slow or no further decline in kidney function following diagnosis, while others rapidly progress to end stage kidney disease (ESKD).

== History ==
High incidence of kidney disease in young agricultural workers, mostly in sugarcane, was first reported in communities in Nicaragua, El Salvador and Costa Rica in the 1990s, with the first published report appearing in 2002. Early studies suggested that MeN was most prevalent in communities with a large proportion of individuals working in sugarcane and other high-intensity agriculture, as well as in non-agricultural occupations involving heavy manual labor in hot environments at sea level, and was less prevalent among subsistence farmers and in communities located at higher altitudes.

A landmark international research meeting devoted to MeN, organized primarily by the Program on Work, Environment and Health in Central America (SALTRA), occurred in 2012. This workshop also led to the creation of the Consortium on the Epidemic of Nephropathy in Central America and Mexico (CENCAM), an international group of researchers and clinicians whose mission is to increase international collaboration for the exploration and research of MeN; contribute to a reduction in the overall prevalence and impact of MeN; and raise awareness and action about MeN in Central America and Mexico. Two additional international workshops were held in 2015 and 2019, and summaries of all three workshops are available.

In April 2013, a high-level meeting with regional health ministries, nongovernmental organizations, aid agencies, clinical specialists and researchers was held in San Salvador city, El Salvador, leading the Panamerican Health Organization (PAHO) to finally declare CKDu "a pressing and extremely serious health problem in the region". The Declaration described CKD as having "catastrophic effects associated with toxic-environmental and occupational factors, dehydration and behaviors harmful to renal health". In it, the Ministers of Health of the Central American Integration System [SICA, the Spanish acronym] declared their commitment to address CKDu comprehensively and to "strengthening scientific research in the framework of the prevention and control of chronic non-communicable diseases". This Declaration was subsequently endorsed by PAHO through the Resolution CD52.R1, adopted during the 52nd Directing Council, 65th Session of the Regional Committee of WHO for the Americas, in October 2013.

== See also ==
CKDu in Sri Lanka
