= Chronic kidney disease =

Abnormal kidney structure or gradual loss of kidney function

- Other names: Chronic renal disease, kidney failure, impaired kidney function
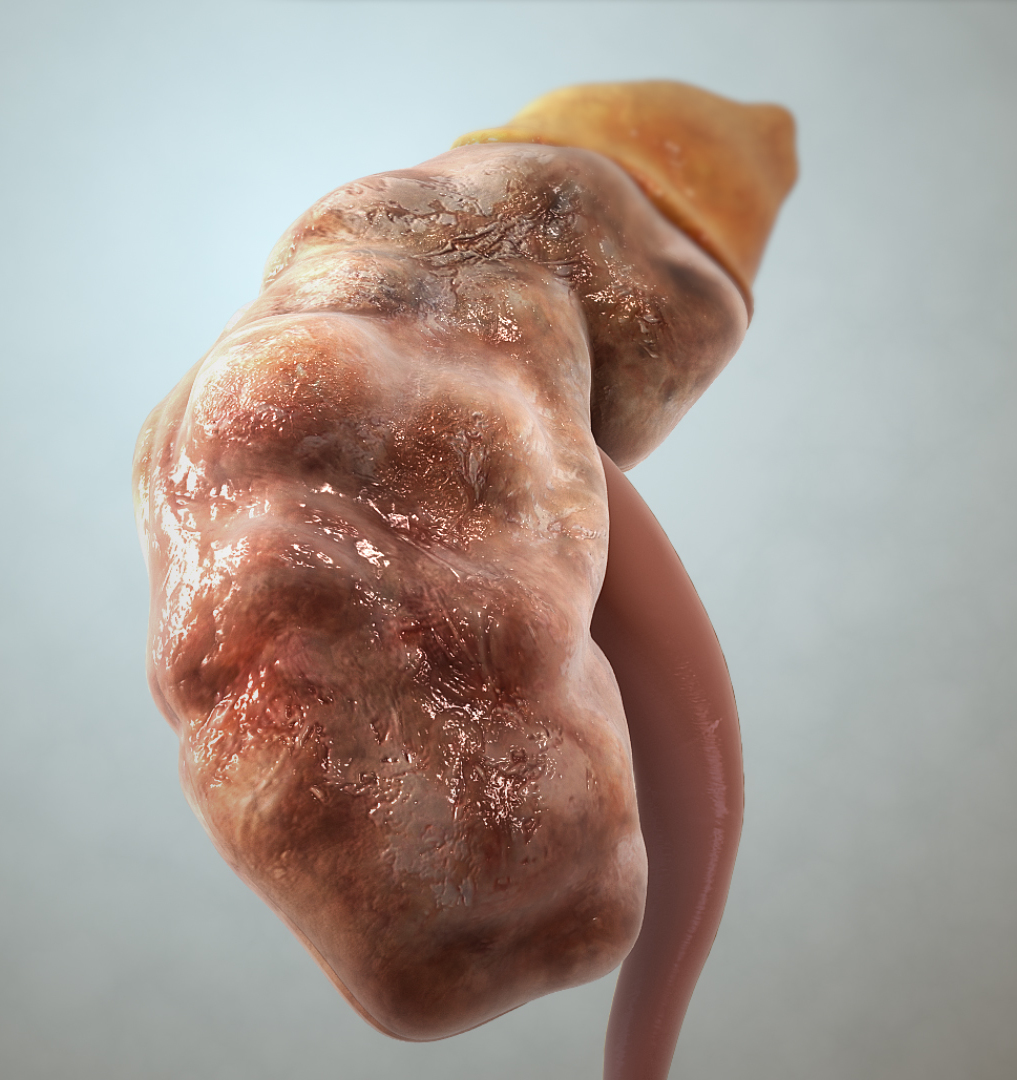
- Illustration of a kidney from a person with chronic renal failure
- Specialty: Nephrology
- Symptoms: Early: None; Later: Leg swelling, feeling tired, vomiting, foamy urine, loss of appetite, confusion
- Complications: Heart disease, high blood pressure, anemia
- Duration: Long-term
- Causes: Diabetes, heart failure, high blood pressure, glomerulonephritis, polycystic kidney disease
- Risk factors: Smoking, genetic predisposition, low socioeconomic status,
- Diagnostic method: Blood tests, urine tests
- Treatment: Medications to manage blood pressure, blood sugar, and lower cholesterol, renal replacement therapy, kidney transplant
- Frequency: 753 million (2016)
- Deaths: 1.2 million (2015)

Chronic kidney disease (CKD) is a type of long-term kidney disease, defined by the sustained presence of abnormal kidney function and/or abnormal kidney structure. To meet the criteria for CKD, the abnormalities must be present for at least three months. Early in the course of CKD, patients are usually asymptomatic, but can be diagnosed via proteinuria. At later stages, the symptoms may include leg swelling, feeling tired, vomiting, loss of appetite, and confusion. Complications can relate to hormonal dysfunction of the kidneys and include high blood pressure (often related to activation of the renin–angiotensin system), insulin resistance, bone disease, and anemia. Additionally CKD patients have markedly increased cardiovascular complications with increased risks of death and hospitalization. CKD can lead to end-stage kidney failure requiring kidney dialysis or kidney transplantation.

Causes of chronic kidney disease include diabetes, high blood pressure, glomerulonephritis, and polycystic kidney disease. Risk factors include a family history of chronic kidney disease. Diagnosis is by blood tests to measure the estimated glomerular filtration rate (eGFR), and a urine test to measure albumin. Ultrasound or kidney biopsy may be performed to determine the underlying cause. Several severity-based staging systems are in use.

Testing people with risk factors (case-finding) is recommended. Initial treatments may include medications to lower blood pressure, blood sugar, and cholesterol. Angiotensin converting enzyme inhibitors (ACEIs) or angiotensin II receptor antagonists (ARBs) are generally first-line agents for blood pressure control, as they slow progression of the kidney disease and the risk of heart disease. Loop diuretics may be used to control edema and, if needed, to further lower blood pressure. NSAIDs should be avoided. Other recommended measures include staying active, and "to adopt healthy and diverse diets with a higher consumption of plant-based foods compared to animal-based foods and a lower consumption of ultraprocessed foods." Plant-based diets are feasible and are associated with improved intermediate outcomes and biomarkers. An example of a general, healthy diet, suitable for people with CKD who do not require restrictions, is the Canada Food Guide Diet. People with CKD who require dietary restrictions or who have other specific nutritional problems should be referred to a dietitian. Treatments for anemia and bone disease may also be required. Severe disease requires hemodialysis, peritoneal dialysis, or a kidney transplant for survival.

8–16% of the world's population has chronic kidney disease. Other estimates have chronic kidney disease affecting 753 million people globally in 2016 (417 million females and 336 million males). In 2015, it caused 1.2 million deaths, up from 409,000 in 1990. The causes that contribute to the greatest number of deaths are high blood pressure at 550,000, followed by diabetes at 418,000, and glomerulonephritis at 238,000.

== Signs and symptoms ==
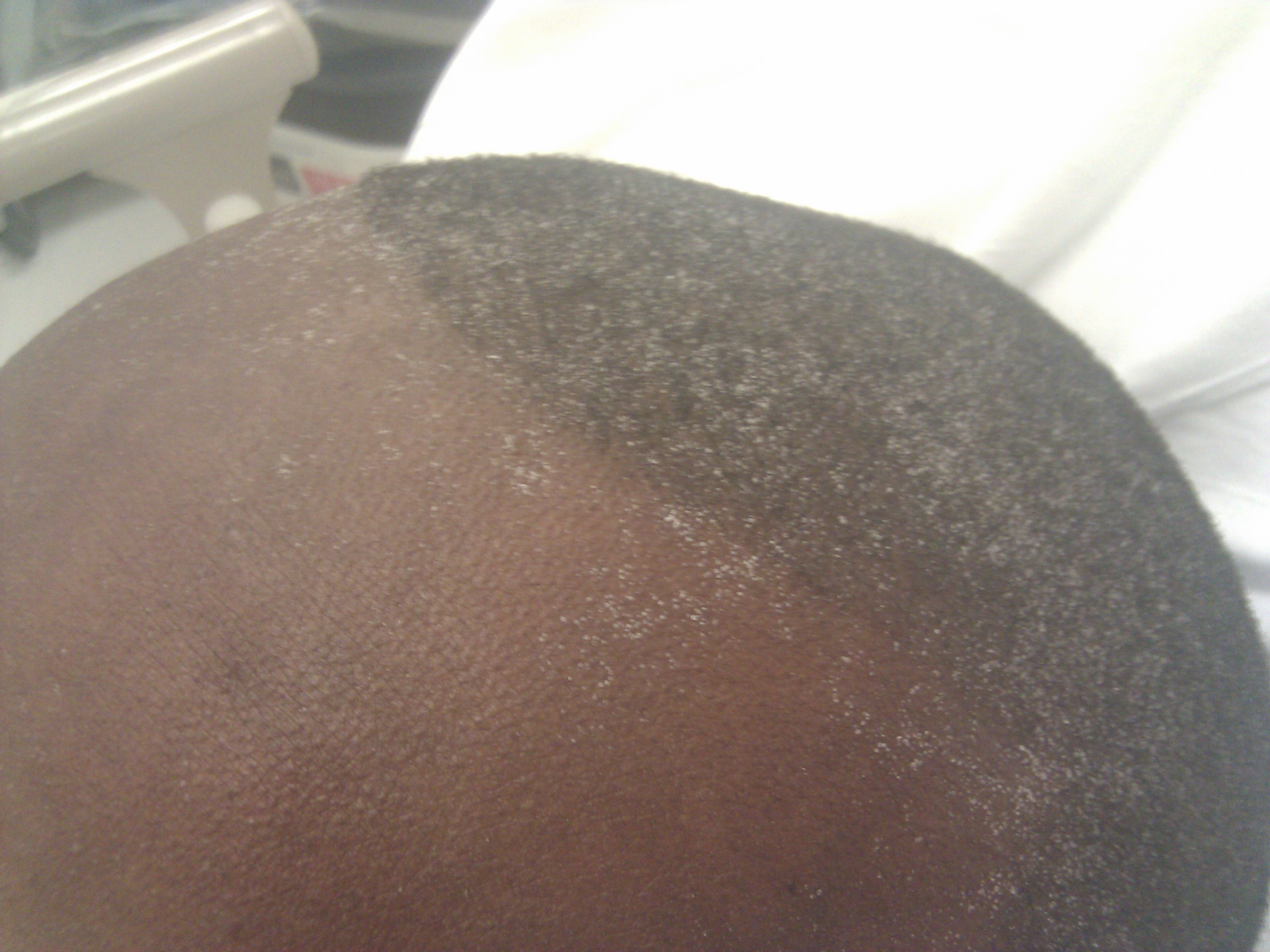
Uremic frost on the head in someone with chronic kidney disease

CKD is initially without symptoms and is usually detected on routine screening blood work by either an increase in serum creatinine, or protein in the urine. As the kidney function decreases, more unpleasant symptoms may emerge:

- Blood pressure is increased due to fluid overload and the production of vasoactive hormones created by the kidney via the renin-angiotensin system, increasing the risk of developing hypertension and heart failure. People with CKD are more likely than the general population to develop atherosclerosis with consequent cardiovascular disease, an effect that may be at least partly mediated by uremic toxins.
- Urea accumulates, leading to azotemia and ultimately uremia (symptoms ranging from lethargy to pericarditis and encephalopathy). Due to its high systemic concentration, urea is excreted in eccrine sweat at high concentrations and crystallizes on the skin as the sweat evaporates ("uremic frost").
- Potassium accumulates in the blood (hyperkalemia with a range of symptoms including malaise and potentially fatal cardiac arrhythmias). Hyperkalemia usually does not develop until the glomerular filtration rate falls to less than 20–25 mL/min/1.73 m^{2}, when the kidneys have decreased ability to excrete potassium. Hyperkalemia in CKD can be exacerbated by acidemia (triggering the cells to release potassium into the bloodstream to neutralize the acid) and from a lack of insulin.
- Fluid overload symptoms may range from mild edema to life-threatening pulmonary edema.
- Hyperphosphatemia results from poor phosphate elimination in the kidney, and contributes to increased cardiovascular risk by causing vascular calcification. Circulating concentrations of fibroblast growth factor-23 (FGF-23) increase progressively as the kidney capacity for phosphate excretion declines, which may contribute to left ventricular hypertrophy and increased mortality in people with CKD.
- Hypocalcemia results from 1,25 dihydroxyvitamin D_{3} deficiency (caused by high FGF-23 and reduced kidney mass) and the skeletal resistance to the calcemic action of parathyroid hormone. Osteocytes are responsible for the increased production of FGF-23, which is a potent inhibitor of the enzyme 1-alpha-hydroxylase (responsible for the conversion of 25-hydroxycholecalciferol into 1,25 dihydroxyvitamin D_{3}). Later, this progresses to secondary hyperparathyroidism, kidney osteodystrophy, and vascular calcification that further impairs cardiac function. An extreme consequence is the occurrence of the rare condition named calciphylaxis.
- Changes in mineral and bone metabolism that may cause 1) abnormalities of calcium, phosphorus (phosphate), parathyroid hormone, or vitamin D metabolism; 2) abnormalities in bone turnover, mineralization, volume, linear growth, or strength (kidney osteodystrophy); and 3) vascular or other soft-tissue calcification. CKD–mineral and bone disorders have been associated with poor outcomes.
- Metabolic acidosis may result from decreased capacity to generate enough ammonia from the cells of the proximal tubule. Acidemia affects the function of enzymes and increases the excitability of cardiac and neuronal membranes by promoting hyperkalemia.
- Anemia is common and is especially prevalent in those requiring hemodialysis. It is multifactorial in cause but includes increased inflammation, reduction in erythropoietin, and hyperuricemia leading to bone marrow suppression. Hypoproliferative anemia occurs due to inadequate production of erythropoietin by the kidneys.
- In later stages, cachexia may develop, leading to unintentional weight loss, muscle wasting, weakness, and anorexia.
- Cognitive decline in patients experiencing CKD is an emerging symptom revealed in research literature. Research suggests that patients with CKD face a 35–40% higher likelihood of cognitive decline and or dementia. This relation is dependent on the severity of CKD in each patient; although emerging literature indicates that patients at all stages of CKD will have a higher risk of developing these cognitive issues.
- Sexual dysfunction is very common in both men and women with CKD. A majority of men have a reduced sex drive, difficulty obtaining an erection, and difficulty reaching orgasm, and the problems get worse with age. Most women have trouble with sexual arousal, and painful menstruation and problems with performing and enjoying sex are common.

== Causes ==
The most common causes of CKD are diabetes mellitus, hypertension, and glomerulonephritis. About one of five adults with hypertension and one of three adults with diabetes have CKD. If the cause is unknown, it is called idiopathic.

=== By anatomical location ===
- Vascular disease includes large-vessel disease such as bilateral kidney artery stenosis and small-vessel disease such as ischemic nephropathy, hemolytic–uremic syndrome, and vasculitis.
- Glomerular disease comprises a diverse group and is classified into:
  - Primary glomerular disease such as focal segmental glomerulosclerosis and IgA nephropathy (or nephritis)
  - Secondary glomerular disease such as diabetic nephropathy and lupus nephritis
- Tubulointerstitial disease includes drug- and toxin-induced chronic tubulointerstitial nephritis, and reflux nephropathy
- Obstructive nephropathy, as exemplified by bilateral kidney stones and benign prostatic hyperplasia of the prostate gland; rarely, pinworms infecting the kidney can cause obstructive nephropathy.

=== Other ===
- Genetic congenital disease such as polycystic kidney disease or 17q12 microdeletion syndrome.
- Mesoamerican nephropathy, is "a new form of kidney disease that could be called agricultural nephropathy". A high and so-far unexplained number of new cases of CKD, referred to as the Mesoamerican nephropathy, has been noted among male workers in Central America, mainly in sugarcane fields in the lowlands of El Salvador and Nicaragua. Heat stress from long hours of piece-rate work at high average temperatures of about 36 °C (96 °F) is suspected, as are agricultural chemicals.
- Chronic lead exposure
- Long-term lithium treatment is known to cause chronic kidney disease after 10-20 years of treatment in 1-5% of people. End-stage renal disease due to lithium occurs in 0.53% of people versus 0.2% in the general population. Dosing lithium more than once per day is associated with more kidney damage. Kidney harm can be mitigated by dosing lithium once per day at night and keeping the dose as low as possible. Dosing lithium once per day allows for long periods where the kidney is exposed to low levels of lithium, which minimizes kidney harm.

== Diagnosis ==
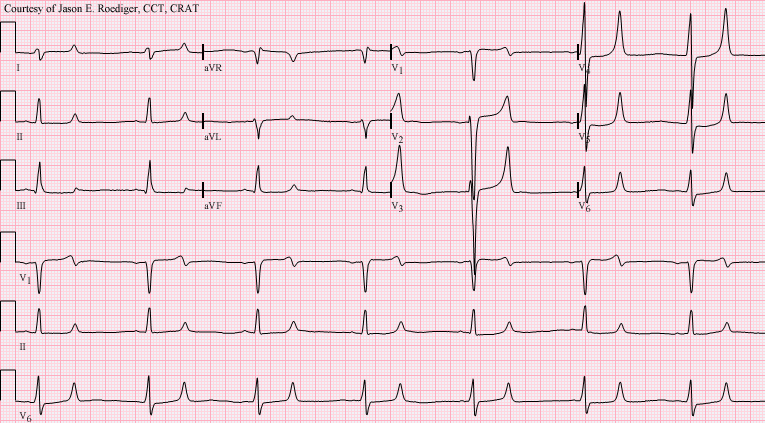
A 12-lead ECG of a person with CKD and a severe electrolyte imbalance: hyperkalemia (7.4 mmol/L) with hypocalcemia (1.6 mmol/L). The T-waves are peaked and the QT interval is prolonged.

Diagnosis of CKD is largely based on history, examination, and urine dipstick combined with the measurement of the serum creatinine level. Differentiating CKD from acute kidney injury (AKI) is important because AKI can be reversible. One diagnostic clue that helps differentiate CKD from AKI is a gradual rise in serum creatinine (over several months to years) rather than a sudden increase (several days to weeks). In many people with CKD, previous kidney disease or other underlying diseases are already known. A significant number present with CKD of unknown cause.

=== Screening ===
Screening those who have neither symptoms nor risk factors for CKD is not recommended. Those who should be screened include: those with hypertension or history of cardiovascular disease, those with diabetes or marked obesity, those aged > 60 years, subjects with African American ancestry, those with a history of kidney disease in the past, and subjects who have relatives who had kidney disease requiring dialysis.

Screening should include calculation of the estimated GFR (eGFR) from the serum creatinine level, and measurement of urine albumin-to-creatinine ratio (ACR) in a first-morning urine specimen (this reflects the amount of a protein called albumin in the urine), as well as a urine dipstick screen for hematuria.

The GFR is derived from the serum creatinine and is proportional to 1/creatinine, i.e., it is a reciprocal relationship; the higher the creatinine, the lower the GFR. It reflects one aspect of kidney function, how efficiently the glomeruli – the filtering units – work. The normal GFR is >90 ml/min. The units of creatinine vary between countries, but since the glomeruli comprise <5% of the kidneys' mass, the GFR does not reflect all aspects of kidney health and function. This can be done by combining the GFR level with a clinical assessment, including fluid status, and measuring hemoglobin, potassium, phosphate, and parathyroid hormone.

=== Ultrasound ===
Kidney ultrasonography is useful for diagnostic and prognostic purposes in chronic kidney disease. Whether the underlying pathologic change is glomerular sclerosis, tubular atrophy, interstitial fibrosis, or inflammation, the result is often increased echogenicity of the cortex. The echogenicity of the kidney should be related to the echogenicity of the liver or the spleen. Moreover, decreased kidney size and cortical thinning are often seen, especially when the disease progresses. However, kidney size correlates to height, and short persons tend to have small kidneys; thus, kidney size as the only parameter is unreliable.

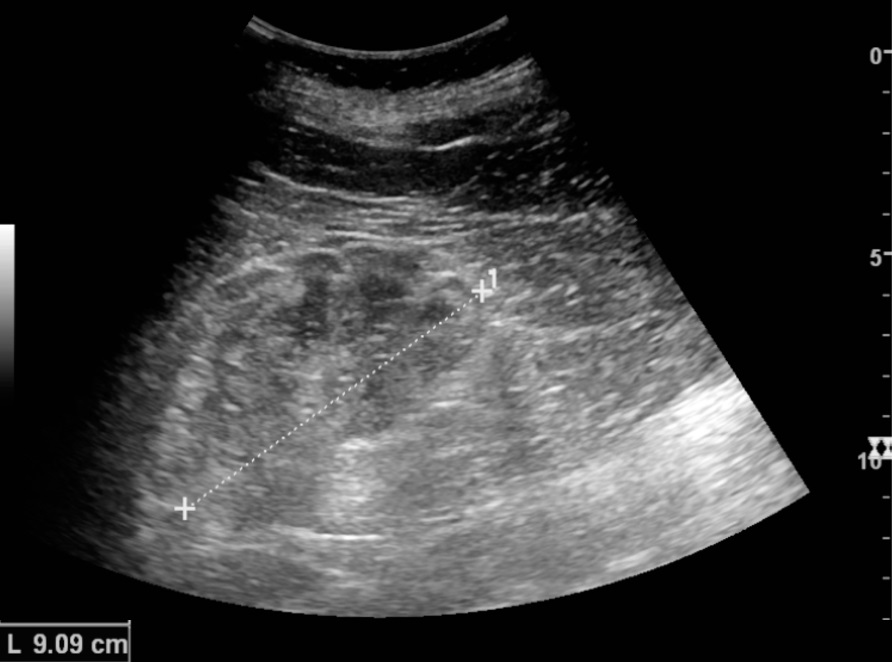
Chronic kidney disease caused by glomerulonephritis with increased echogenicity and reduced cortical thickness. Measurement of kidney length on the US image is illustrated by '+' and a dashed line.

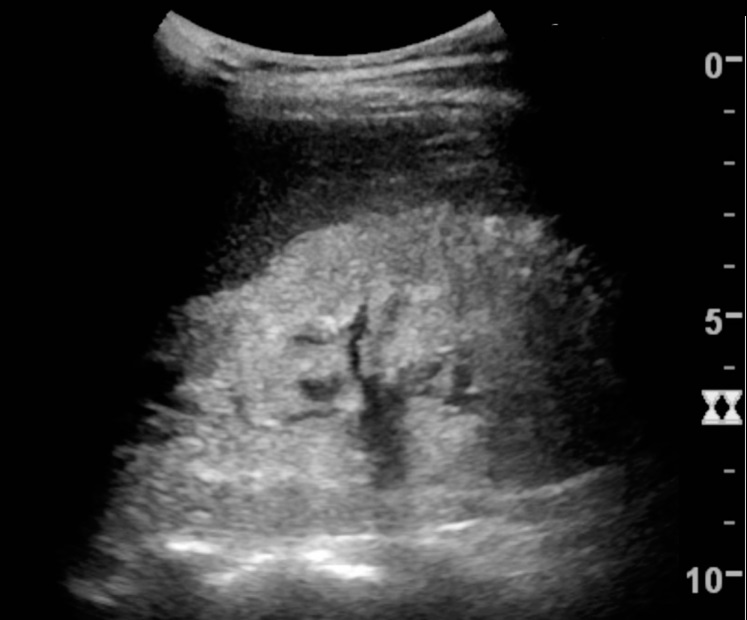
Nephrotic syndrome. Hyperechoic kidney without demarcation of cortex and medulla.

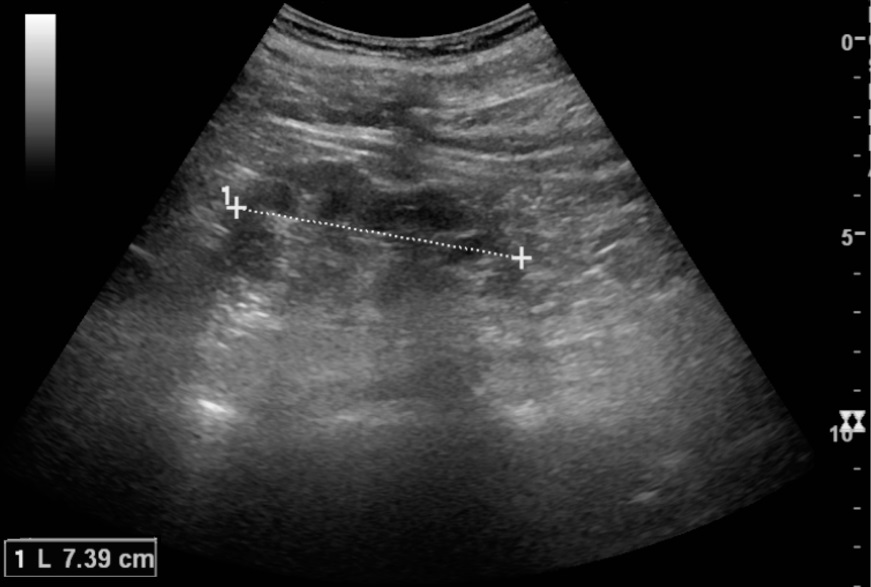
Chronic pyelonephritis with reduced kidney size and focal cortical thinning. Measurement of kidney length on the US image is illustrated by '+' and a dashed line.

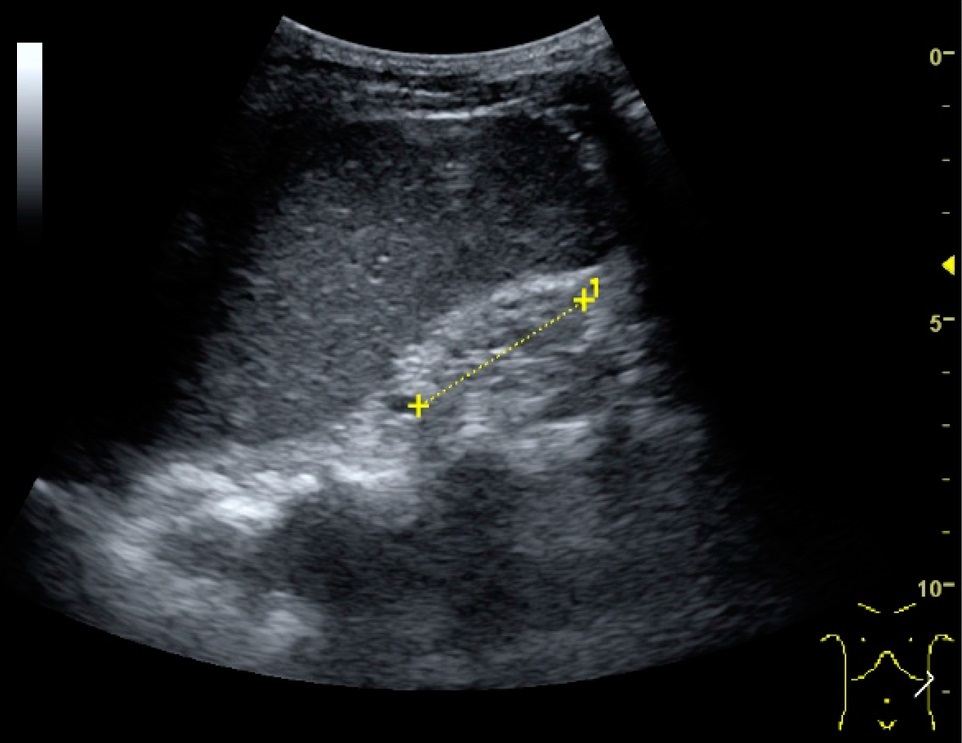
End-stage chronic kidney disease with increased echogenicity, homogenous architecture without visible differentiation between parenchyma and renal sinus, and reduced kidney size. Measurement of kidney length on the US image is illustrated by '+' and a dashed line.

=== Additional imaging ===
Additional tests may include nuclear medicine MAG3 scan to confirm blood flow and establish the differential function between the two kidneys. Dimercaptosuccinic acid (DMSA) scans are also used in kidney imaging, with both MAG3 and DMSA being used chelated with the radioactive element technetium-99.

=== Stages ===
Chronic kidney disease (CKD) staging – CKD G1-5 A1-3 glomerular filtration rate (GFR) and albumin/creatinine ratio (ACR)
ACR GFR			A1	A2	A3
ACR GFR			Normal to mildly increased	Moderately increased	Severely increased
ACR GFR			< 30	30–300	> 300
G1	Normal	≥ 90	1 if kidney damage present	1	2
G2	Mildly decreased	60–89	1 if kidney damage present	1	2
G3a	Mildly to moderately decreased	45–59	1	2	3
G3b	Moderately to severely decreased	30–44	2	3	3
G4	Severely decreased	15–29	3	4+	4+
G5	Kidney failure	< 15	4+	4+	4+
Numbers 1–4 indicate the risk of progression as well as the frequency of monitoring (number of times a year). Kidney Disease Improving Global Outcomes – KDIGO 2012 Clinical Practice Guideline for the Evaluation and Management of Chronic Kidney Disease

A glomerular filtration rate (GFR) ≥ 60 mL/min/1.73 m^{2} is considered normal without chronic kidney disease if there is no kidney damage present.

Kidney damage is defined as signs of damage seen in blood, urine, or imaging studies, which include a urine albumin/creatinine ratio (ACR) ≥ 30. All people with a GFR <60 mL/min/1.73 m^{2} for 3 months are defined as having chronic kidney disease.

Protein in the urine is regarded as an independent marker for the worsening of kidney function and cardiovascular disease. Hence, British guidelines append the letter "P" to the stage of chronic kidney disease if protein loss is significant.

1. Stage 1: Slightly diminished function; kidney damage with normal or relatively high GFR (≥90 mL/min/1.73 m^{2}) and persistent albuminuria. Kidney damage is defined as pathological abnormalities or markers of damage, including abnormalities in blood or urine tests or imaging studies.
2. Stage 2: Mild reduction in GFR (60–89 mL/min/1.73 m^{2}) with kidney damage. Kidney damage is defined as pathological abnormalities or markers of damage, including abnormalities in blood or urine tests or imaging studies.
3. Stage 3: Moderate reduction in GFR (30–59 mL/min/1.73 m^{2}):. British guidelines distinguish between stage 3A (GFR 45–59) and stage 3B (GFR 30–44) for purposes of screening and referral.
4. Stage 4: Severe reduction in GFR (15–29 mL/min/1.73 m^{2}) Preparation for kidney replacement therapy.
5. Stage 5: Established kidney failure (GFR <15 mL/min/1.73 m^{2}), permanent kidney replacement therapy, or end-stage kidney disease.

The term "non-dialysis-dependent chronic kidney disease" (NDD-CKD) is a designation used to encompass the status of those persons with an established CKD who do not yet require the life-supporting treatments for kidney failure known as kidney replacement therapy (RRT, including maintenance dialysis or kidney transplantation). The condition of individuals with CKD, who require either of the two types of kidney replacement therapy (dialysis or transplant), is referred to as end-stage kidney disease (ESKD). Hence, the start of the ESKD is practically the irreversible conclusion of the NDD-CKD. Even though the NDD-CKD status refers to the status of persons with earlier stages of CKD (stages 1 to 4), people with advanced stages of CKD (stage 5), who have not yet started kidney replacement therapy, are also referred to as NDD-CKD.

== Management ==
Chronic kidney disease (CKD) is a serious condition often linked to diabetes and high blood pressure. There is no cure, but a combination of lifestyle changes and medications can help slow its progression. This might include a plant-dominant diet with less protein and salt, medications to control blood pressure and sugar, and potentially newer anti-inflammatory drugs. Doctors may also focus on managing heart disease risk, preventing infections, and avoiding further kidney damage. While dialysis may eventually be needed, a gradual transition can help preserve remaining kidney function. Further research is ongoing to improve CKD management and patient outcomes.

=== Blood pressure ===
Angiotensin converting enzyme inhibitors (ACEIs) or angiotensin II receptor antagonists (ARBs) are recommended as first-line agents since they have been found to slow the decline of kidney function, relative to a more rapid decline in those not on one of these agents. They have also been found to reduce the risk of major cardiovascular events such as myocardial infarction, stroke, heart failure, and death from cardiovascular disease when compared to placebo in individuals with CKD. ACEIs may be superior to ARBs for protection against progression to kidney failure and death from any cause in those with CKD. Aggressive blood pressure lowering decreases people's risk of death.

=== Other measures ===
- Aggressive treatment of high blood lipids is recommended. Statins are recommended for those with CKD older than 50 years old, and those younger if certain other indications exist.
- Certain medications that are cleared from the body by the kidneys may need dose adjustments or discontinuation in those with chronic kidney disease to prevent accumulation of the medications in the body.
- Sodium-glucose cotransporter-2 (SGLT2) inhibitors are recommended by the 2024 KDIGO guideline to slow CKD progression in adults with eGFR ≥20 mL/min/1.73 m² who have type 2 diabetes, heart failure, or significant albuminuria, with benefits seen regardless of diabetes status. In the DAPA-CKD trial, dapagliflozin reduced a composite of sustained eGFR decline, end-stage kidney disease, or kidney or cardiovascular death compared with placebo in patients with CKD with or without type 2 diabetes. The EMPA-KIDNEY trial reported a similar benefit for empagliflozin across a broader CKD population, including patients without diabetes.
- The 2024 KDIGO guideline suggests a protein intake of approximately 0.8 g/kg body weight per day in metabolically stable adults with CKD stages G3–G5, and recommends avoiding high protein intake (>1.3 g/kg/d) in those at risk of progression. A more restrictive very-low-protein diet (0.3–0.4 g/kg/d) supplemented with essential amino acids or ketoacid analogues may be considered in selected patients at risk of kidney failure who are willing and able to follow it, under close supervision; it is not appropriate for people who are metabolically unstable, frail, sarcopenic, or undernourished, and is not recommended for children due to growth concerns. The earlier evidence base for unsupplemented low-protein diets predates widespread use of RAS inhibitors and SGLT2 inhibitors, and protein restriction alone has weaker support than these pharmacological therapies for slowing CKD progression.
- Anemia – A target hemoglobin level of 100–120 g/L is recommended; raising hemoglobin levels to the normal range has not been found to be of benefit.
  - Guidelines recommend treatment with parenteral iron prior to treatment with erythropoietin.
  - Replacement of erythropoietin is often necessary in people with advanced disease.
  - It is unclear if androgens improve anemia.
- Calcitriol is recommended for vitamin D deficiency and control of metabolic bone disease.
- Phosphate binders are used to control the serum phosphate levels, which are usually elevated in advanced chronic kidney disease.
- Phosphodiesterase-5 inhibitors and zinc may improve sexual dysfunction in men.
- Gadolinium based MRI contrast agents are contraindicated in those with GFR less than 30 (stage 4 kidney disease) due to the risk of nephrogenic systemic fibrosis. However, this risk is believed to be low in people with CKD, with newer contrast agents being used.

=== Lifestyle interventions ===
==== Weight loss ====
Obesity may have a negative impact in CKD, increasing the risk of disease progression to ESKD or kidney failure compared to controls with healthy weight, and when in advanced stages, may also hinder people's eligibility for kidney transplantation. For example, the consumption of high calorie and high fructose beverages can make an individual "60% more likely to develop CKD". The cause would be a combination of inflammation, hemodynamic, and metabolic alterations, with visceral obesity being the main driver of the damage.

Weight management interventions in overweight and obese adults with CKD include lifestyle interventions (dietary changes, physical activity/exercise, or behavioural strategies), pharmacological (used to reduce absorption or suppress appetite), and surgical interventions. Any of these can help people with CKD lose weight; however, it is not known if they can also prevent death or cardiovascular events like heart complications or stroke. It is recommended that weight management interventions should be individualised, according to a thorough patient assessment regarding clinical condition, motivations, and preferences.

==== Dietary salt intake ====
High dietary sodium intake may increase the risk of hypertension and cardiovascular disease. The effect of dietary salt restriction in foods has been investigated in people with chronic kidney disease. For people with CKD, including those on dialysis, reduced salt intake may help to lower both systolic and diastolic blood pressure, as well as albuminuria. Some people may experience low blood pressure and associated symptoms, such as dizziness, with lower salt intake. The effect of salt restriction on extracellular fluid, oedema, and total body weight reduction is unknown.

EHealth interventions may improve dietary sodium intake and fluid management for people with CKD.

==== Omega-3 supplementation ====
In people with CKD who require hemodialysis, there is a risk that vascular blockage due to clotting, may prevent dialysis therapy from being possible. Even though Omega-3 fatty acids contribute to the production of eicosanoid molecules that reduce clotting, it does not have any impact on the prevention of vascular blockage in people with CKD.

==== Protein supplementation ====
Regular consumption of oral protein-based nutritional supplements may increase serum albumin levels slightly in people with CKD, especially among those requiring hemodialysis or who are malnourished. Prealbumin level and mid-arm muscle circumference may also be increased following supplementation. Despite possible improvement in these indicators of nutritional status, it is not certain that protein supplements affect the quality of life, life expectancy, inflammation, or body composition.

==== Iron supplementation ====
Intravenous (IV) iron therapy may help more than oral iron supplements in reaching target hemoglobin levels. However, allergic reactions may also be more likely following IV-iron therapy.

=== Sleep ===
Individuals with CKD have increased prevalence of sleep apnea compared to the general population (both obstructive sleep apnea and central sleep apnea). The presence of sleep apnea in CKD has been associated with an increased risk of cardiovascular events and mortality.

People with CKD also experience sleep disorders and are thus unable to get quality sleep. Several strategies could help, such as relaxation techniques, exercise, and medication. Exercise may be helpful with sleep regulation and may decrease fatigue and depression in people with CKD. However, none of these options has been proven to be effective in the treatment of sleep disorders. It is unknown what the best guidance is to improve sleep quality in this population.

=== Referral to a nephrologist ===
Guidelines for referral to a nephrologist vary between countries. Most agree that nephrology referral is required by Stage 4 CKD (when eGFR/1.73m^{2} is less than 30 mL/min; or decreasing by more than 3 mL/min/year).

It may also be useful at an earlier stage (e.g., CKD3) when the urine albumin-to-creatinine ratio is more than 30 mg/mmol, when blood pressure is difficult to control, or when hematuria or other findings suggest either a primarily glomerular disorder or secondary disease amenable to a specific treatment. Other benefits of early nephrology referral include proper education regarding options for kidney replacement therapy, as well as pre-emptive transplantation, and timely workup and placement of an arteriovenous fistula in those people with chronic kidney disease opting for future hemodialysis.

=== Renal replacement therapy ===
At stage 5 CKD, kidney replacement therapy is usually required, in the form of either dialysis or a kidney transplant.

In CKD, numerous uremic toxins accumulate in the blood. Even when ESKD (largely synonymous with CKD5) is treated with dialysis, the toxin levels do not return to normal, as dialysis is not that efficient. Similarly, after a kidney transplant, the levels may not go back to normal as the transplanted kidney may not work 100%. If it does, the creatinine level is often normal. The toxins have various cytotoxic activities in serum and have different molecular weights, and some are bound to other proteins, primarily to albumin. Uremic toxins are classified into three groups: small water-soluble solutes, middle molecular-weight solutes, and protein-bound solutes. Hemodialysis with high-flux dialysis membrane, long or frequent treatment, and increased blood/dialysate flow has improved removal of water-soluble small molecular weight uremic toxins. Middle molecular weight molecules are removed more effectively with hemodialysis using a high-flux membrane, hemodiafiltration, and hemofiltration. However, conventional dialysis treatment is limited in its ability to remove protein-bound uremic toxins.

== Prognosis ==
CKD increases the risk of cardiovascular disease, and people with CKD often have other risk factors for heart disease, such as high blood lipids. People with both CKD and cardiovascular disease have significantly worse prognoses than those with only cardiovascular disease. Those with CKD have a higher prevalence of cardiovascular disease (65% compared to 32% in a Medicare population of people older than 66. Those with CKD in the population also had worse 2-year survival after a heart attack, atrial fibrillation, stroke or transient ischemic attack (TIA, commonly known as a mini-stroke), heart failure or coronary artery disease.

Rapidly progressive CKD (rapid declines in the GFR or increasing albuminuria), uncontrolled hypertension, severe electrolyte abnormalities, structural abnormalities of the kidneys, hereditary kidney disease, blood in the urine, recurrent severe kidney stones, and nephrotic syndrome (high levels of protein in the urine) are all associated with a poor prognosis and more rapid progression to ESKD.

Chronic kidney disease results in worse all-cause mortality (the overall death rate) which increases as kidney function decreases. The leading cause of death in chronic kidney disease is cardiovascular disease, regardless of whether there is progression to stage 5.

While kidney replacement therapies can maintain people indefinitely and prolong life, the quality of life is negatively affected. Kidney transplantation increases the survival of people with stage 5 CKD when compared to other options; however, it is associated with an increased short-term mortality due to complications of the surgery. Transplantation aside, high-intensity home hemodialysis appears to be associated with improved survival and quality of life compared to the conventional three-times-a-week hemodialysis and peritoneal dialysis.

People with ESKD are at increased overall risk for cancer. This risk is particularly high in younger people and gradually diminishes with age. Medical specialty professional organizations recommend that physicians do not perform routine cancer screening in people with limited life expectancies due to ESKD because the evidence does not show that such tests lead to improved outcomes.

In children and adolescents, growth failure is a common complication of CKD. Children with CKD will be shorter than 97% of children the same age and sex. This can be treated with additional nutritional support or medication such as growth hormone.

=== Survival without dialysis ===
Survival rates of CKD are generally longer with dialysis than without (having only conservative kidney management). However, from the age of 80 and in elderly patients with comorbidities, there is no difference in survival between the two groups. Quality of life might be better for people without dialysis.

People who had decided against dialysis treatment when reaching end-stage chronic kidney disease could survive several years and experience improvements in their mental well-being in addition to sustained physical well-being and overall quality of life until late in their illness course. However, use of acute care services in these cases is common, and the intensity of end-of-life care is highly variable among people opting out of dialysis.

== Epidemiology ==
About one in ten people has chronic kidney disease. In Canada, 1.9 to 2.3 million people were estimated to have CKD in 2008. CKD affected an estimated 13.9% of U.S. adults aged 18 years and older in the period from 2017 to 2020. In 2007 8.8% of the population of Great Britain and Northern Ireland had symptomatic CKD.

Chronic kidney disease was the cause of 956,000 deaths globally in 2013, up from 409,000 deaths in 1990.

=== Chronic kidney disease of unknown aetiology ===
The cause of chronic kidney disease is sometimes unknown; it is referred to as chronic kidney disease of unknown aetiology (CKDu). As of 2020, a rapidly progressive chronic kidney disease, unexplained by diabetes and hypertension, had increased dramatically in prevalence over a few decades in several regions in Central America and Mexico, a CKDu referred to as the Mesoamerican nephropathy (MeN). It was estimated in 2013 that at least 20,000 men had died prematurely, some in their 20s and 30s; a figure of 40,000 per year was estimated in 2020. In some affected areas, CKD mortality was five times the national rate. MeN primarily affects men working as sugarcane labourers. The cause is unknown, but in 2020 the science found a clearer connection between heavy labour in high temperatures and incidence of CKDu; improvements such as regular access to water, rest and shade, can significantly decrease the potential CKDu incidence. CKDu also affects people in Sri Lanka where it is the eighth largest cause of in-hospital mortality.

=== Race ===
African, Hispanic, and South Asian (particularly those from Pakistan, Sri Lanka, Bangladesh, and India) populations are at high risk of developing CKD. Africans are at greater risk due to the number of people affected by hypertension among them. As an example, 37% of ESKD cases in African Americans can be attributed to high blood pressure, compared with 19% among Caucasians. Treatment efficacy also differs between racial groups. Administration of antihypertensive drugs generally halts disease progression in white populations but has little effect in slowing kidney disease among black people, and additional treatment such as bicarbonate therapy is often required. While lower socioeconomic status contributes to the number of people affected by CKD, differences in the number of people affected by CKD are still evident between Africans and Whites when controlling for environmental factors.

Although CKD was of unknown etiology when it was first documented among sugar cane workers in Costa Rica in the 1970s, it may well have affected plantation laborers since the introduction of sugar cane farming to the Caribbean in the 1600s. In colonial times, the death records of slaves on sugar plantations were much higher than for slaves forced into other labor.

== Society and culture ==
=== Organisations ===
The International Society of Nephrology is an international body representing specialists in kidney diseases.

==== United States ====
- The National Kidney Foundation is a national organization representing people with chronic kidney diseases and professionals who treat kidney diseases.
- The American Kidney Fund is a national nonprofit organization providing treatment-related financial assistance to one of every five people undergoing dialysis each year.
- The Renal Support Network is a nonprofit, patient-focused, patient-run organization that provides non-medical services to those affected by CKD.
- The American Association of Kidney Patients is a nonprofit, patient-centric group focused on improving the health and well-being of CKD and people undergoing dialysis.
- The Renal Physicians Association is an association representing nephrology professionals.

==== United Kingdom ====
It was said to be costing the National Health Service about £1.5 billion a year in 2020.

Kidney Care UK and The UK National Kidney Federation represent people with chronic kidney disease. The Renal Association represents Kidney physicians and works closely with the National Service Framework for kidney disease.

== Other animals ==
=== Dogs ===
The incidence rate of CKD in dogs was 15.8 cases per 10,000 dog years at risk. The mortality rate of CKD was 9.7 deaths per 10,000 dog years at risk. (Rates developed from a population of 600,000 insured Swedish dogs; one dog year at risk is one dog at risk for one year). The breeds with the highest rates were the Bernese mountain dog, miniature schnauzer, and boxer. The Swedish elkhound, Siberian husky, and Finnish spitz were the breeds with the lowest rates.

=== Cats ===
Cats with chronic kidney disease may have a buildup of waste products usually removed by the kidneys. They may appear lethargic, unkempt, and lose weight, and may have hypertension. The disease can prevent the appropriate concentration of urine, causing cats to urinate in greater volumes and drink more water to compensate. Loss of important proteins and vitamins through urine may cause abnormal metabolism and loss of appetite. The buildup of acids within the blood can result in acidosis, which can lead to anemia (which can sometimes be indicated by pink or whitish gums, but by no means does the presence of normal colored gums guarantee that anemia is not present or developing), and lethargy.
