= James Sabin =

American psychiatrist and ethicist

James Evan Sabin
- Born: 1939
- Education: Harvard College (BA, Philosophy and Psychology, 1960); Harvard Medical School (MD, 1964)
- Known for: accountability for reasonableness, psychiatric ethics, healthcare ethics
- Scientific career
- Fields: psychiatry, population health, health ethics, philosophy, ethics
- Workplaces: Harvard Pilgrim Health Care, Harvard Medical School, Harvard University

James Evan Sabin is an American psychiatrist, bioethicist, and health policy scholar. He is best known for his co-development of the "Accountability for Reasonableness" (A4R) ethical framework for fair health care resource allocation, in collaboration with philosopher Norman Daniels. Sabin's work integrates clinical psychiatry, ethics, and organizational decision-making in managed care and public health systems.

== Career and contributions ==
Sabin served as Clinical Professor in the Department of Population Medicine at Harvard Medical School and as Director of the Ethics Program at Harvard Pilgrim Health Care, where he pioneered models for ethical oversight in managed care. He is also a Faculty Affiliate at the Harvard Medical School Center for Bioethics.

He is co-author, with Norman Daniels, of Setting Limits Fairly: Can We Learn to Share Medical Resources? (Oxford University Press), a widely cited book that elaborates the A4R framework. This model has been applied by policymakers and public health agencies in the United Kingdom, Canada, and by international institutions such as the World Bank and the World Health Organization.

Sabin has published extensively in the fields of clinical ethics, psychiatric ethics, and health policy. He is recognized for addressing ethical dilemmas in mental health care, including issues of consent, equity, and institutional responsibility. His writings appear in journals such as Health Affairs, The Hastings Center Report, Psychiatric Services, and BMJ.

For seven years, from 1979 to 1986, while he was already Professor of Harvard Medical School, he also was Associate Medical Director of the Harvard Community Health Plan. Then, in 2000, he became Director of the Ethics Program of Harvard Pilgrim Health Care (which had developed from the Harvard Community Health Plan). In 2008, he founded the Ethics and Strategy Group in order to "provide organizational ethics consultation to health plans, hospitals, medical groups and other health entities."

== Selected publications ==
- Daniels, N., & Sabin, J. E. (2008). Setting Limits Fairly: Can We Learn to Share Medical Resources? 2nd edition. Oxford University Press. DOI: 10.1093/acprof:oso/9780195149364.001.0001
- Sabin, J. E. (1998). "Fairness, accountability, and transparency in health care rationing." *Hastings Center Report*. DOI: 10.1002/hast.807
- Sabin, J. E., & Daniels, N. (1997). "The ethics of accountability in managed care reform." *JAMA*. DOI: 10.1001/jama.1997.03550130055037

== Honors ==
- Safra Center for Ethics (at Harvard), Senior Scholar in Ethics in 1999-2000

== See also ==
- Accountability for reasonableness
- Crowdsourcing
- Decision-making
- Psychiatric ethics
- Rationing of health care services
