= Baron Norrie =

Title in the Peerage of the United Kingdom

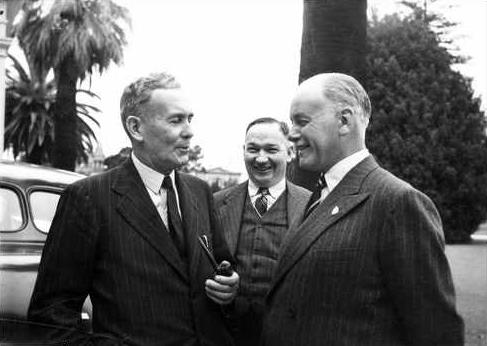
Lord Norrie (right) meeting Prime Minister of Australia Ben Chifley (left) and Premier of South Australia Tom Playford (centre)

Baron Norrie, of Wellington in New Zealand and of Hawkesbury Upton in the County of Gloucester, is a title in the Peerage of the United Kingdom. It was created on 22 August 1957 for Sir Willoughby Norrie upon his retirement as Governor-General of New Zealand. As of 2010 the title is held by his eldest son, the second Baron, who succeeded in 1977.

== Barons Norrie (1957) ==
- (Charles) Willoughby Moke Norrie, 1st Baron Norrie (1893–1977)
- George Willoughby Moke Norrie, 2nd Baron Norrie (b. 1936)

The heir apparent is the present holder's son Hon. Mark Willoughby John Norrie (b. 1972)

The heir apparent's heir apparent is his son Archie Michael George Norrie (b. 2001)

=== Line of Succession ===
- Lt.-Gen. Charles Willoughby Moke Norrie, 1st Baron Norrie (1893–1977)
  - George Willoughby Moke Norrie, 2nd Baron Norrie (born 1936)
    - (1) Hon. Mark Willoughby John Norrie (b. 1972)
      - (2) Archie Michael George Norrie (b. 2001)
      - (3) Willoughby Thomas Blaise Norrie (b. 2003)
      - (4) Charles Samuel Moke Norrie (b. 2013)
  - (5) Lt.-Col. Hon. Guy Bainbridge Norrie (b. 1940)
    - (6) Andrew Guy Norrie (b. 1970)
    - (7) James Adam George Norrie (b. 1973)
      - (8) William James Norrie (b. 2008)
