= CKDu in Sri Lanka =

Kidney disease

Chronic kidney disease of unknown etiology (CKDu) is an increasing health concern in Sri Lanka. CKDu is recognized as chronic kidney disease without the usual associated causative factors. The first cases of CKDu were reported in Sri Lanka's North Central Province (NCP). Chronic kidney disease (listed under diseases of the urinary tract), was identified as the 8th leading cause of in-hospital mortality in Sri Lanka, and the leading cause of death in Anuradhapura and Polonnaruwa in 2016. This rise in mortality coincided with the increasing cases of CKDu seen across the country. Studies have shown an estimated 70,000 CKDu patients in high risk areas. Various possible causes for CKDu in Sri Lankans have been investigated, including poisoning from metals, cyanobacteria toxins, agrochemicals, and heat stress, but no definite causes have been identified.

There have been several other geographic areas in which CKDu has emerged, such as Africa, Central America (see Mesoamerican nephropathy), and Asia. Due to similar signs and symptoms of CKDu in these areas, CKDu is also referred to as Chronic Interstitial Nephritis in Agricultural Communities.

== Geographic distribution ==
CKDu is most common in Sri Lanka's NCP, but cases also have been identified in some parts of Eastern, Central, and North Western provinces. The affected villages are located in the dry zone of the country where it rains only a few months a year.

== Demographics ==
A combination of poverty and lack of access to healthcare has made clinical diagnosis of CKDu difficult. The majority of patients are of low socioeconomic status and live in agricultural areas, or are involved in farming. Although it also occurs in females and youth, the majority of CKDu patients are males between 17 and 70 years of age. High numbers of CKDu cases are individuals in their most productive working age (30 – 60 years), creating a negative economic impact in affected areas. Within the NCP and its bordering villages, a 15-20% prevalence of CKDu has been reported.

== Timeline ==
1990 - CKDu first reported in Sri Lanka's dry zones.

2009 - Sri Lanka's Ministry of Health and The World Health Organization conducted a study to determine the etiology of CKDu with the goal of developing preventative strategies.

2016 - A case definition for CKDu was developed and published by Sri Lanka's Ministry of Health to help identify CKDu in Sri Lanka.

== Disease overview ==
CKDu is characterized by a lack of common risk factors (e.g. diabetes and hypertension) normally associated with Chronic Kidney Disease. This disease manifests itself as asymptomatic at first, with a slow progression until later stages, when it becomes irreversible. The most common symptoms include: fatigue, panting, lack of appetite, nausea, and anemia. CKDu typically results in death due to low access to dialysis and organ transplant technology. Annual deaths are estimated at 1,400 based on medical and clinical observations. Affected kidneys exhibit a toxic etiology called tubulointerstitial nephritis.

== Possible causes ==
The concentration of CKDu cases in the NCP suggests multiple risk factors - including a combination of nephrotoxins - that may be responsible for the prevalence of this disease. Potential causes include dehydrating working conditions, genetic susceptibility, and various lifestyle factors. Although one single causative factor has not been identified as the source of CKDu, occupational and environmental causes have been identified as the main reason for the prevalence of the disease. Possible environmental exposures include:

=== Drinking water ===
The lack of surface water in the dry zone of Sri Lanka has led many people in the NCP to rely mainly on groundwater in dug and tube wells. An estimated 87% of the population in dry zone regions use and consume groundwater. Elevated fluoride levels and distribution patterns in potable water have been detected in the drinking water of CKDu prevalent areas. Fluoride is an important causal component of CKDu due to its tendency to accumulate in the kidneys. Additionally, studies have shown that there may be a possible link between water hardness, fluoride concentration, and CKDu prevalence. Therefore, drinking water quality might be a significant contributing factor to the disease; several villages that have implemented drinking water regulations seemed to have lower cases of CKDu.

=== Exposure to metals ===
The widespread use of agrochemicals in Sri Lanka has led some researchers to study various heavy metals found within these chemicals as potential causes of CKDu in afflicted regions. The significant differences in between wet and dry cycles in the dry zone can influence the bioavailability of heavy metals. People can be exposed to these metals through water and diet. Heavy metals can induce the synthesis of Metallothionein proteins, which are responsible for metal detoxification in the body. Heavy metal-induced oxidative stress plays a role in renal toxicity and injury to the proximal tubules. It is possible that a combination of reactions between heavy metals and water hardness might be contributing to the prevalence of CKDu. Specific metals of concern include:

- Cadmium: A known nephrotoxic environmental toxin reported to impair kidney function following exposure. Low levels detected in drinking water in CKDu affected areas.
- Arsenic: Combined with water hardness, has been shown to cause kidney damage through calcium arsenate crystal formation. Low levels detected in drinking water in CKDu affected areas.
- Aluminum: Concern if combined with fluoride into aluminum-fluoride complexes, which could potentially move through biological membranes easier than aluminum and fluoride can individually. Low levels detected in drinking water in CKDu affected areas, but other potential sources include poor quality aluminum pots which can leach out aluminum during cooking.

== Mitigation considerations ==
Due to the unknown etiology of CKDu, funding for the clinical care of affected populations and continued research is important. Some preventative suggestions based on proposed risk factors for CKDu include drinking only treated and spring water, regulated safety protocol for agrochemicals, and improved work practices to prevent dehydration.
