= Renal replacement therapy =

Blood treatment used in kidney failure

- Specialty: Nephrology
- MeSH: D017582

Renal replacement therapy (RRT) is therapy that replaces the normal blood-filtering function of the kidneys. It is used when the kidneys are not working well, which is called kidney failure and includes acute kidney injury and chronic kidney disease. Renal replacement therapy includes dialysis (hemodialysis or peritoneal dialysis), hemofiltration, and hemodiafiltration, which are various ways of filtration of blood with or without machines. Renal replacement therapy also includes kidney transplantation, in which a donor kidney takes over the function of the patient’s failing kidneys.

These treatments are not truly cures for kidney disease. In the context of chronic kidney disease, they are more accurately viewed as life-extending treatments, although if chronic kidney disease is managed well with dialysis and a compatible graft is found early and is successfully transplanted, the clinical course can be quite favorable, with life expectancy of many years. Likewise, in certain acute illnesses or trauma resulting in acute kidney injury, a person could very well survive for many years, with relatively good kidney function, before needing intervention again, as long as they had good response to dialysis, they got a kidney transplant fairly quickly if needed, their body did not reject the transplanted kidney, and they had no other significant health problems. Early dialysis (and, if indicated, early renal transplant) in acute kidney failure usually brings more favorable outcomes.

== Types ==
Hemodialysis, hemofiltration, and hemodiafiltration can be continuous or intermittent and can use an arteriovenous route (in which blood leaves from an artery and returns via a vein) or a venovenous route (in which blood leaves from a vein and returns via a vein). This results in various types of RRT, as follows:

- continuous renal replacement therapy (CRRT) — continuous renal replacement therapy (CRRT) is a form of dialysis therapy used in critical care settings. The benefit of CRRT for critically ill patients is that it runs slowly (generally over 24 hours to several days) allowing for removal of excess fluid and uremic toxins with less risk of hypotensive complications.
  - continuous hemodialysis (CHD)
    - continuous arteriovenous hemodialysis (CAVHD)
    - continuous venovenous hemodialysis (CVVHD)
  - continuous hemofiltration (CHF)
    - continuous arteriovenous hemofiltration (CAVH or CAVHF)
    - continuous venovenous hemofiltration (CVVH or CVVHF)
  - continuous hemodiafiltration (CHDF)
    - continuous arteriovenous hemodiafiltration (CAVHDF)
    - continuous venovenous hemodiafiltration (CVVHDF)
- intermittent renal replacement therapy (IRRT)
  - intermittent hemodialysis (IHD)
    - intermittent venovenous hemodialysis (IVVHD)
  - intermittent hemofiltration (IHF)
    - intermittent venovenous hemofiltration (IVVH or IVVHF)
  - intermittent hemodiafiltration (IHDF)
    - intermittent venovenous hemodiafiltration (IVVHDF)

== History of Continuous Renal Replacement Therapy ==
Before implementing continuous renal replacement therapy (CRRT), acute renal failure (ARF) in critically ill, multiple organ failure patients was managed by intermittent hemodialysis and the mortality rate was very high. Hemodialysis is effective in clearance and ultrafiltration, but it has deleterious effects on hemodynamic stability. In 1971, Lee Henderson described the basis for convective transport in blood purification techniques. Subsequently, in 1974 he described hemodiafiltration combining convection and diffusion. These seminal papers represented the basis for the development of chronic hemodiafiltration by Leber and continuous arteriovenous hemofiltration (CAVH) by Peter Kramer.

With his team, Peter Kramer (Died unexpectedly in 1984), had actually first reported the use of continuous hemofiltration in Germany in 1977. Peter Kramer in ASAIO presented a paper describing the use of arteriovenous hemofiltration in the management of ARF. Kramer tried that as a mean of managing diuretic-resistant fluid overload. Kramer described his experience of attaching a microporous hemofilter to the femoral artery and vein, and flowing blood through it at around 100 ml/minute. Liters of plasma filtrate poured out. He replaced it with an infusion of electrolyte solution. Kramer explained that this could be done continuously, avoiding the volume shifts and other problems of intermittent hemodialysis. For those in the audience who cared for patients with anuric ARF, this was an epiphany of thunderbolt proportions. He used a hollow fiber "haemofilter" that was originally designed as an alternative to HD for chronic renal failure and produced 300-600 ml/hour of ultrafiltrate by convection. The simple, pumpless system made use of temporary dialysis catheters sited in the patient's femoral artery and vein and could be rapidly established in critically ill patients. Using an isotonic salt solution for fluid replacement, continuous arteriovenous hemofiltration (CAVH) was soon extended to the management of ARF. In 1982, Kramer presented his experience with its use in more than 150 intensive care patients at a meeting of the American Society for Artificial Internal Organs(ASAIO). Before that, Henderson et al and Knopp, had studied hemofiltration in animals and as an alternative to dialysis in chronic renal failure, but it was really Peter Kramer's report in ASAIO meeting in 1982 that stimulated many of nephrologists and intensivists to undertake the serious evaluation of CAVH in ARF in the ICU.

At first, in CAVH, the prescribed ultrafiltration rate was achieved manually by arranging the filtrate bag at the right height, thereby changing the negative pressure caused by the filtrate column. The replacement fluid was also regulated manually. Few years later, CAVH was developed in several centers for managing ARF in critically ill patients with multiple organ failure. In 1986, it has been reported that CAVH improve the patient survival from 9% to 38% with full nutrition in ARF. Moreover, a workshop presented at ASAIO in 1988 summarized the development and role of continuous hemofiltration. Since late 1980s, continuous renal replacement therapy (CRRT) has been studied extensively. In 1982, the use of CAVH in Vicenza was extended for the first time to a neonate with the application of specific minifilters . Two years later, CAVH began to be used to treat septic patients, burn patients and patients after transplantation and cardiac surgery, even with regional citrate anticoagulation. In 1986, the term continuous renal replacement therapy was applied to all these continuous approaches. The technology and terminology were expanded to include slow continuous ultrafiltration for fluid removal without replacement, continuous arteriovenous hemodialysis (CAVHD), and continuous arteriovenous hemodiafiltration. Meanwhile, clinical and technical limitations of CAVH spurred new research and the discovery of new treatments, leading to the development of continuous veno-venous hemofiltration (CVVH), continuous veno-venous hemodialysis (CVVHD) and continuous veno-venous hemodiafiltration (CVVHDF). The low depurative efficiency was overcome by applying filters with two ports in the dialysate/filtrate compartment and through the use of counter-current dialysate flow, allowing the addition of diffusion and the birth of continuous arteriovenous hemodiafiltration or hemodialysis (CAVHDF or CAVHD).

Development of double-lumen venous catheters and peristaltic blood pumps was invented in the mid-1980s, when CVVH was proposed. The presence of a pump that generated negative pressure in part of the circuit made it necessary to add a device to detect the presence of air and a sensor to monitor the pressure in the circuit, to avoid, respectively, air embolisms and circuit explosion in case of coagulation or obstruction of the venous line. Later, ultrafiltrate and replacement pumps and a heater were added to the circuit. The development of CVVH allows to increase the exchange volumes, and subsequently, the depurative efficiency. The use of counter-current dialysate flow led to further improvements and the birth of CVVHD and CVVHDF. Now Continuous renal replacement therapy has become the mainstay of management of renal failure for multiple organ failure patients in the ICU.

Information technology and precision medicine have recently furthered the evolution of CRRT, providing the possibility of collecting data in large databases and evaluating policies and practice patterns. The application of artificial intelligence and enhanced human intelligence programs to the analysis of big data has further moved the front of research ahead, providing the possibility of creating silica-trials and finding answers to patients' unmet clinical needs. The opportunity to evaluate the endophenotype of the patient makes it possible to adjust treatments and techniques by implementing the concept of precision CRRT. This allows clinicians to normalize outcomes and results among different populations or individuals and establish optimal and personalized care

== Ethical discussions ==
Accountability for reasonableness is often used as a theory of ethics to understand the decision-making process behind renal replacement therapy.

== See also ==
- Artificial kidney
