= Hemofiltration =

Medical procedure

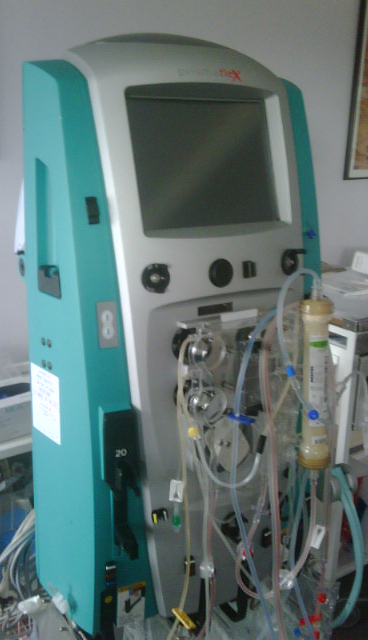
- Hemofilter ready for use
- Specialty: Nephrology
- ICD-9-CM: 39.95
- MeSH: D006440

Hemofiltration, also haemofiltration, is a renal replacement therapy used in the intensive care setting. It is usually used to treat acute kidney injury (AKI), but may be of benefit in multiple organ dysfunction syndrome or sepsis. During hemofiltration, a patient's blood is passed through a set of tubing (a filtration circuit) via a machine to a semipermeable membrane (the filter) where waste products and water (collectively called ultrafiltrate) are removed by convection. Replacement fluid is added and the blood is returned to the patient.

As in dialysis, in hemofiltration one achieves movement of solutes across a semi-permeable membrane. However, solute movement with hemofiltration is governed by convection rather than by diffusion. With hemofiltration, dialysate is not used. Instead, a positive hydrostatic pressure drives water and solutes across the filter membrane from the blood compartment to the filtrate compartment, from which it is drained. Solutes, both small and large, get dragged through the membrane at a similar rate by the flow of water that has been engendered by the hydrostatic pressure. Thus convection overcomes the reduced removal rate of larger solutes (due to their slow speed of diffusion) seen in hemodialysis.

== Hemodiafiltration ==
Hemofiltration is sometimes used in combination with hemodialysis, when it is termed hemodiafiltration. Blood is pumped through the blood compartment of a high flux dialyzer, and a high rate of ultrafiltration is used, so there is a high rate of movement of water and solutes from blood to dialysate that must be replaced by substitution fluid that is infused directly into the blood line. However, dialysis solution is also run through the dialysate compartment of the dialyzer. The combination is theoretically useful because it results in good removal of both large and small molecular weight solutes.

== Intermittent vs. continuous ==
These treatments can be given intermittently or continuously. The latter is usually done in an intensive care unit setting. There may be little difference in clinical and health economic outcome between the two in the context of acute kidney failure.

=== On-line intermittent hemofiltration (IHF) or hemodiafiltration (IHDF) ===
Either of these treatments can be given in outpatient dialysis units, three or more times a week, usually 3–5 hours per treatment. IHDF is used almost exclusively, with only a few centers using IHF. With both IHF or IHDF, the substitution fluid is prepared on-line from dialysis solution by running dialysis solution through a set of two membranes to purify it before infusing it directly into the blood line. In the United States, regulatory agencies have not yet approved on-line creation of substitution fluid because of concerns about its purity. For this reason, hemodiafiltration has historically never been used in an outpatient setting in the United States.

=== Continuous hemofiltration or hemodiafiltration (CHDF) ===
Continuous hemofiltration (CHF) was first described in a 1977 paper by Kramer et al. as a treatment for fluid overload. Hemofiltration is most commonly used in an intensive care unit setting, where it is either given as 8- to 12-hour treatments, so called SLEF (slow extended hemofiltration), or as CHF (continuous hemofiltration), also sometimes called continuous veno-venous hemofiltration (CVVH) or continuous renal replacement therapy (CRRT). Hemodiafiltration (SLED-F or CHDF or CVVHDF) also is widely used in this fashion. In the United States, the substitution fluid used in CHF or CHDF is commercially prepared, prepackaged, and sterile (or sometimes is prepared in the local hospital pharmacy), avoiding regulatory issues of on-line creation of replacement fluid from dialysis solution. An alternative method of fluid replacement includes a closed-loop effluent system. New research suggests using an adsorption column to regenerate effluent. This process allows for the recycling of multiparticulate waste, eliminating the need for frequent manual bag changes and increasing the potential run time of the treatment.

With slow continuous therapies, the blood flow rates are usually in the range of 100-200 ml/min, and access is usually achieved through a central venous catheter placed in one of the large central veins. In such cases a blood pump is used to drive blood flow through the filter. Native access for hemodialysis (e.g. AV fistulas or grafts) are unsuitable for CHF because the prolonged residence of the access needles required might damage such accesses.

The length of time before the circuit clots and becomes unusable, often referred to as circuit life, can vary depending on the medication used to keep blood from clotting. Heparin and regional citrate are often used, though heparin carries a higher risk of bleeding. However, a comprehensive analysis of audit data from intensive care units in the UK revealed that, compared with heparin, citrate-based drugs were not associated with fewer deaths among patients with acute kidney injury after 90 days of treatment. Citrate-based drugs were, however, associated with a substantially higher cost of treatment.

== History of continuous renal replacement therapy ==
Before implementing continuous renal replacement therapy (CRRT), acute renal failure (ARF) in critically ill, multiple organ failure patients was managed by intermittent hemodialysis and the mortality rate was very high. Hemodialysis is effective in clearance and ultrafiltration, but it has deleterious effects on hemodynamic stability. In 1971, Lee Henderson described the basis for convective transport in blood purification techniques. Subsequently, in 1974 he described hemodiafiltration combining convection and diffusion. These seminal papers represented the basis for the development of chronic hemodiafiltration by Leber and continuous arteriovenous hemofiltration (CAVH) by Peter Kramer.

With his team, Peter Kramer (Died unexpectedly in 1984), had actually first reported the use of continuous hemofiltration in Germany in 1977. Peter Kramer in ASAIO presented a paper describing the use of arteriovenous hemofiltration in the management of ARF. Kramer tried that as a mean of managing diuretic-resistant fluid overload. Kramer described his experience of attaching a microporous hemofilter to the femoral artery and vein, and flowing blood through it at around 100 ml/minute. Liters of plasma filtrate poured out. He replaced it with an infusion of electrolyte solution. Kramer explained that this could be done continuously, avoiding the volume shifts and other problems of intermittent hemodialysis. For those in the audience who cared for patients with anuric ARF, this was an epiphany of thunderbolt proportions. He used a hollow fiber "haemofilter" that originally designed as an alternative to HD for chronic renal failure and produced 300-600 ml/hour of ultrafiltrate by convection. The simple, pumpless system made use of temporary dialysis catheters sited in the patient's femoral artery and vein and could be rapidly established in critically ill patients. Using an isotonic salt solution for fluid replacement, continuous arteriovenous hemofiltration (CAVH) was soon extended to the management of ARF. In 1982, Kramer presented his experience with its use in more than 150 intensive care patients at a meeting of the American Society for Artificial Internal Organs (ASAIO). Before that, Henderson et al and Knopp had studied hemofiltration in animals and as an alternative to dialysis in chronic renal failure, but it was really Peter Kramer's report in ASAIO meeting in 1982 that stimulated many of nephrologists and intensivists to undertake the serious evaluation of CAVH in ARF in the ICU.

At first, in CAVH, the prescribed ultrafiltration rate was achieved manually by arranging the filtrate bag at the right height, thereby changing the negative pressure caused by the filtrate column. The replacement fluid was also regulated manually. A few years later, CAVH was developed in several centers for managing ARF in critically ill patients with multiple organ failure. In 1986, it has been reported that CAVH improves the patient survival from 9% to 38% with full nutrition in ARF. Moreover, a workshop presented at ASAIO in 1988 summarized the development and role of continuous hemofiltration. Since late 1980s, continuous renal replacement therapy (CRRT) has been studied extensively. In 1982, the use of CAVH in Vicenza was extended for the first time to a neonate with the application of specific minifilters . Two years later, CAVH began to be used to treat septic patients, burn patients and patients after transplantation and cardiac surgery, even with regional citrate anticoagulation. In 1986, the term continuous renal replacement therapy was applied to all these continuous approaches. The technology and terminology were expanded to include slow continuous ultrafiltration for fluid removal without replacement, continuous arteriovenous hemodialysis (CAVHD), and continuous arteriovenous hemodiafiltration. Meanwhile, clinical and technical limitations of CAVH spurred new research and the discovery of new treatments, leading to the development of continuous veno-venous hemofiltration (CVVH), continuous veno-venous hemodialysis (CVVHD) and continuous veno-venous hemodiafiltration (CVVHDF). The low depurative efficiency was overcome by applying filters with two ports in the dialysate/filtrate compartment and through the use of counter-current dialysate flow, allowing the addition of diffusion and the birth of continuous arteriovenous hemodiafiltration or hemodialysis (CAVHDF or CAVHD).

Development of double-lumen venous catheters and peristaltic blood pumps was invented in the mid-1980s, when CVVH was proposed. The presence of a pump that generated negative pressure in part of the circuit made it necessary to add a device to detect the presence of air and a sensor to monitor the pressure in the circuit, to avoid, respectively, air embolisms and circuit explosion in case of coagulation or obstruction of the venous line. Later, ultrafiltrate and replacement pumps and a heater were added to the circuit. The development of CVVH allows to increase the exchange volumes, and subsequently, the depurative efficiency. The use of counter-current dialysate flow led to further improvements and the birth of CVVHD and CVVHDF. Continuous renal replacement therapy has now become the mainstay of management of renal failure for multiple organ failure patients in the ICU.

Information technology and precision medicine have recently furthered the evolution of CRRT, providing the possibility of collecting data in large databases and evaluating policies and practice patterns. The application of artificial intelligence and enhanced human intelligence programs to the analysis of big data has further moved the front of research ahead, providing the possibility of creating silica-trials and finding answers to patients' unmet clinical needs. The opportunity to evaluate the endophenotype of the patient makes it possible to adjust treatments and techniques by implementing the concept of precision CRRT. This allows clinicians to normalize outcomes and results among different populations or individuals and establish optimal and personalized care.

== See also ==
- Hemodialysis
- Renal replacement therapy
- Extracorporeal therapy
