= UK National Kidney Federation =

UK charity

The UK National Kidney Federation, founded 1979, is a national kidney charity in the United Kingdom run by patients with kidney problems and their carers, for kidney patients. The NKF runs a national helpline and a website, and organises an annual conference.

The controlling council consists of the patient Associations of hospital renal units. As its members are not healthcare professionals, its role is restricted to campaigning for improvements to renal provision and treatment, and national patient support services. It works closely with the All Party Parliamentary Kidney Group (APPKG) whose stated purpose is: "To improve understanding in Parliament of kidney disease and transplant medicine and promote improvements in the health and care services that are available to improve the health of people with chronic kidney disease.

A football team from Leicestershire named NKF Burbage operated from 2009 to 2020 and were named after the charity.

== See also ==
- UK Kidney Association
