= National Service Framework =

British health plans

A National Service Framework (NSF) was any of several policies set by the National Health Service (NHS) in England to define standards of care for major medical issues such as cancer, coronary heart disease, chronic obstructive pulmonary disease, diabetes, kidney disease, long-term conditions, mental health, old age, and stroke care.

NSFs were ten-year plans developed in partnership with health professionals, patients, carers, health service managers, voluntary agencies and other experts.

The two main roles of NSFs were to:

- Set clear quality requirements for care based on the best available evidence of what treatments and services work most effectively for patients.
- Offer strategies and support to help organisations meet these requirements.

The first NSF was published in 1999. NSFs were discontinued in 2013 with the formation of NHS England.
