= Nephrotoxicity =

Toxicity in the kidneys

Nephrotoxicity is toxicity in the kidneys. It is a poisonous effect of some substances, both toxic chemicals and medications, on kidney function. There are various forms, and some drugs may affect kidney function in more than one way. Nephrotoxins are substances displaying nephrotoxicity.

Nephrotoxicity should not be confused with some medications predominantly excreted by the kidneys needing their dose adjusted for the decreased kidney function (e.g., heparin, lithium).

== Types of toxicity ==
=== Cardiovascular ===
- General: diuretics, β-blockers, vasodilator agents
- Local: ACE inhibitors, ciclosporin, tacrolimus.

=== Direct tubular effect ===
- Proximal convoluted tubule: Aminoglycoside antibiotics (e.g., gentamicin), amphotericin B, cisplatin, radiocontrast media, immunoglobulins, mannitol
- Distal tubule: NSAIDs (e.g. aspirin, ibuprofen, diclofenac), ACE inhibitors, ciclosporin, lithium salts, cyclophosphamide, amphotericin B
- Tubular obstruction: sulphonamides, methotrexate, aciclovir, diethylene glycol, triamterene.

=== Acute interstitial nephritis ===
Main article : Acute interstitial nephritis

- β-lactam antibiotics, vancomycin, rifampicin, sulphonamides, ciprofloxacin, NSAIDs, ranitidine, cimetidine, furosemide, thiazides, phenytoin.

=== Chronic interstitial nephritis ===
- Lithium salts
- Ciclosporin

=== Acute glomerulonephritis ===
Drug-induced glomerular disease is not common but there are a few drugs that have been implicated. Glomerular lesions occur primarily through immune-mediated pathways rather than through direct drug toxicity.

- Heroin and Pamidronate are known to cause focal segmental glomerulosclerosis
- Gold salts therapy can cause membranous nephropathy
- Penicillamine

=== Causes of diabetes insipidus ===
- Lithium salts
- Amphotericin B—reversible at low doses, irreversible at high doses
- Fluoride
- Demeclocycline
- Foscarnet

=== Other nephrotoxins ===
- Lead, uranium, mercury, and cadmium salts
- Aristolochic acid, found in some plants and in some herbal supplements derived from those plants, has been shown to have nephrotoxic effects on humans.
- Rhubarb contains some nephrotoxins which can cause inflammation of the kidneys in some people.
- Fumaric acid, aka food additive E297, is nephrotoxic in high doses
- Lilium is very toxic to cats, often resulting in death by acute kidney failure, or permanent renal dysfunction.

== Diagnosis ==
Nephrotoxicity is usually monitored through a simple blood test. A decreased creatinine clearance indicates poor kidney function. In interventional radiology, a patient's creatinine clearance levels are all checked prior to a procedure.

Serum creatinine is another measure of kidney function, which may be more useful clinically when dealing with patients with early kidney disease. Normal creatinine level is between 80 - 120 μmol/L.

== Nephrotoxicity in the medical workplace ==
=== Occupational exposure ===
Hospitals, laboratories, and sanitation jobs or other waste-management fields are some of the many workplaces where there is a higher risk of nephrotoxicity. Occupational nephrotoxicants can include heavy metals, cleaning solvents, and even compounds found in certain medications. There is a higher risk in the medical workplaces due to these workers being exposed to these substances more often than in other professions.

The routes of exposure can include inhalation of chemicals or solvents, dermal contact, or ingestion of these substances. For example, laboratory workers have to deal with chemicals such as formaldehyde and other solvent-based chemicals. These chemicals can lead to nephrotoxicity through build up in the kidneys. Similarly to laboratory workers, healthcare workers can be exposed to some of the substances that can be found in certain medicines. Sanitation workers or others in other waste-management fields can be exposed through the cleaning product materials that they work with on the job.

The longer you are exposed to these substances, the higher chance your kidney is going to be affected by the poisonous effects of the nephrotoxins. This means that as the substances build up in the kidneys and can become inflamed, and they will have a more difficult time filtering waste and become less effective. Over time, this can lead to nephrotoxicity or kidney disease.

=== Chemical mechanisms in Nephrotoxicity ===
Nephrotoxicity in the medical workplace arises when nephrotoxic drugs or chemicals are metabolized and form reactive compounds that damage kidney tissue. Substances commonly handled in medical settings, such as aminoglycoside antibiotics, Non-steroidal Anti-Inflammatory Drugs (NSAIDs), chemotherapy agents, contrast dyes, and solvent-based chemicals, can generate reactive metabolites during biotransformation in the liver or kidneys. These metabolites contribute to oxidative stress, mitochondrial injury, inflammation, and direct damage to renal tubule cells.

A key mechanism involves the formation of reactive oxygen species (free radicals), which harm proteins, lipids, and DNA within kidney tubules. Other nephrotoxicants, including calcineurin inhibitors and heavy metals, reduce renal blood flow by causing vasoconstriction or endothelial injury. Some drugs, including acyclovir and methotrexate, may also crystallize in the tubules and obstruct urine flow.

About 20 percent of nephrotoxicity cases are caused by medications, and the risk increases when individuals handle multiple nephrotoxic substances. In the workplace, healthcare and laboratory employees may be exposed during the preparation, administration, or disposal of hazardous drugs and chemicals. Compounds such as antineoplastic agents, formaldehyde, and heavy-metal containing substances can produce harmful intermediates similar to those generated during metabolism in patients. Understanding these reactions highlights the need for strict exposure controls and monitoring for workers who regularly handle nephrotoxic chemicals.

=== Prevention and control ===
Preventing nephrotoxicity in medical and hospital settings requires a multi-step approach, including preventative measures and control and response to people that have been exposed. This begins with integrating in substitutions for harmful nephrotoxic chemicals, creating exposure controls, proper administrative policies, and appropriate Personal Protective Equipment (PPE). Another important step is control and response, early detection of symptoms, and symptom monitoring for workers and patients that may have higher exposure levels to chemicals that cause nephrotoxicity.

Medical settings have several different ways of preventing and minimizing the risk of nephrotoxicity. Substitutions to nephrotoxic chemicals commonly used in the medical setting should include replacing disinfectants, solvents, antibiotics, chemotherapy drugs, and NSAIDS with safer chemicals for healthcare workers and patients to use. Hospital settings should also provide exposure controls like closed system drug transfer devices, maintaining good ventilation in rooms where drugs are being used, and biological safety cabinets. Solid administrative controls like proper labelling, hazard communication, training programs for employees, and using Safety Data Sheets (SDS) can minimize the risk of exposure further. Employees should be required to wear proper PPE when handling nephrotoxic substances: including gloves, full coverage safety gowns, and respiratory protection over their mouth and nose.

Control and response is also important, and can include baseline and periodic kidney function testing among exposed workers and patients, and having protocols for hazardous waste disposal/management and contamination cleanup. If there is a chemical spill or direct exposure, there should be spill kits, emergency eyewash stations, and immediate medical attention and evaluations offered. Using good waste disposal protocols can also help prevent contamination and cross-contamination of healthcare workers and patients. Patients that must be given nephrotoxic substances should have kidney testing and monitoring evaluations done before and after the drugs are administered to ensure that they receive medical treatment as needed for any resulting nephrotoxicity symptoms.

== Etymology ==
The word nephrotoxicity (/ˌnɛfroʊtɒkˈsɪsɪti/) uses combining forms of nephro- + tox- + -icity, yielding "kidney poisoning".

== See also ==
- Contrast-induced nephropathy
- Toxicity
- Neurotoxicity
- Ototoxicity
- Onconephrology
