= Thad (disambiguation) =

Thad is a masculine given name, often a short form (hypocorism) of Thaddeus.

Thad may also refer to:

- Typhoon Thad, a 1981 typhoon that impacted Japan and its environs
- Transient hepatic attenuation differences, abbreviated THAD, areas of enhancement during the arterial phase of contrast CT of the liver
- Terminal High Altitude Area Defense, abbreviated THAAD, an American anti-ballistic missile defense system
