= Kidney disease =

Pathological conditions of the kidney, impairing the organ's ability to filter blood

- Other names: Renal disease, nephropathy
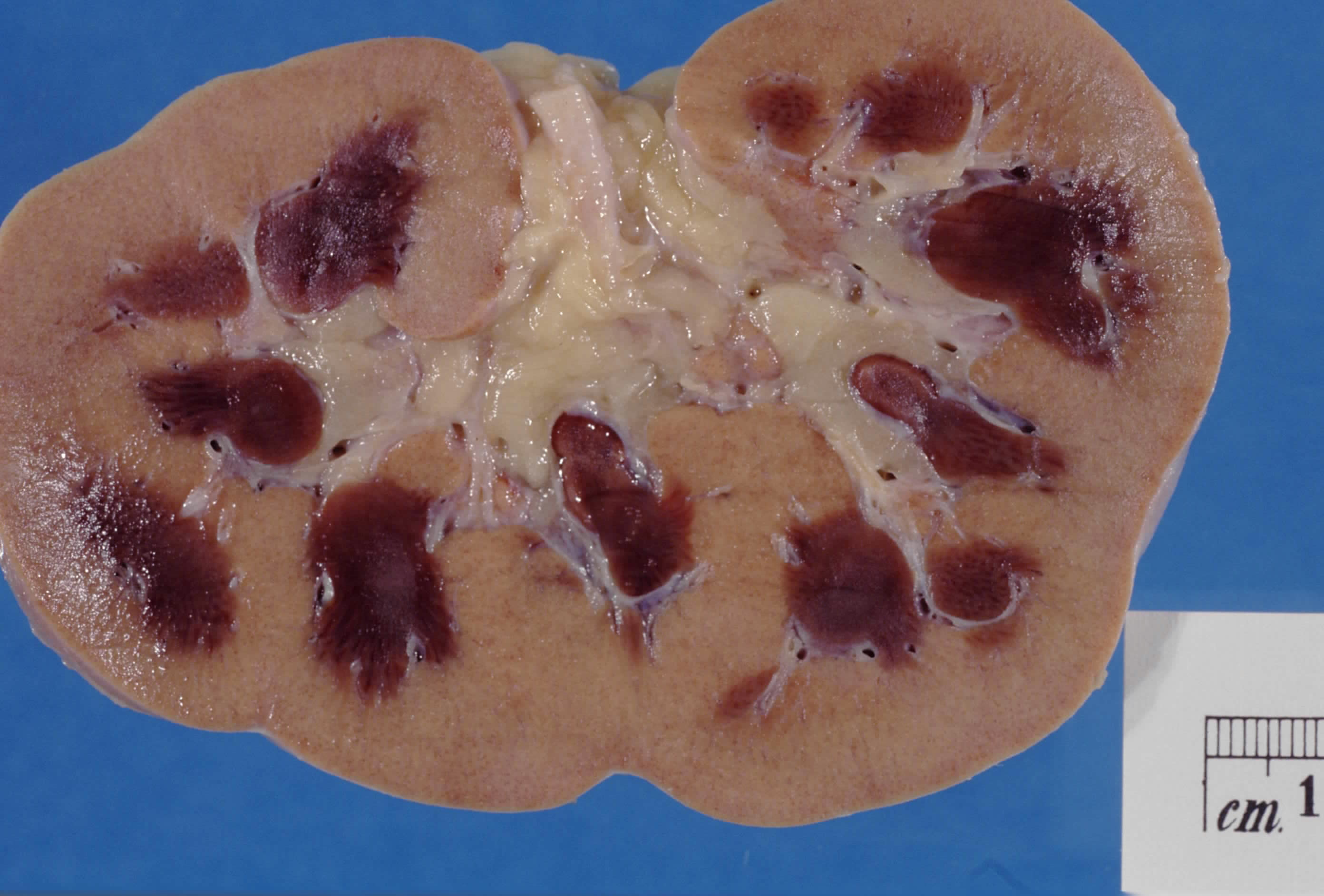
- Pathologic kidney specimen showing marked pallor of the cortex, contrasting to the darker areas of surviving medullary tissue. The patient died with acute kidney injury.
- Specialty: Nephrology, urology
- Complications: Uremia, death

Kidney diseases, or renal diseases, technically referred to as nephropathies, are pathological conditions affecting the kidneys—the organs that facilitate removal of waste products and toxins from the bloodstream, regulate the body's concentration of electrolytes, maintain the appropriate acid-base balance of plasma, and produce urine as a byproduct of metabolism.

When used colloquially, the term kidney disease may refer to chronic kidney disease (CKD), an umbrella term for any progressive loss of kidney function over at least three months, from any cause. In contrast, kidney damage over a shorter period of time is known as acute kidney injury.

From a technical standpoint, the heterogenous group of kidney diseases can be broadly divided into categories based on which anatomical structures are involved: the glomeruli, the filtering capillaries of the kidney; tubules, which carry filtered blood; the renal interstitium, the fluid-filled space between these structures; and the renal blood vessels, which deliver blood towards and away from the kidney. Glomerular disease, or glomerulonephritis, can be further divided into the nephritic and nephrotic syndromes, which are respectively characterized by blood and protein leaking into the urine.

All forms of kidney disease, glomerular or otherwise, have the potential to damage all four components of the kidney, culminating in end-stage renal disease—the stage of disease at which dialysis or a kidney transplant is necessary.

Rates for both chronic kidney disease and mortality have increased, associated with the rising prevalence of diabetes and the aging global population. The World Health Organization has reported that "kidney diseases have risen from the world's nineteenth leading cause of death to the ninth, with the number of deaths increasing by 95% between 2000 and 2021." In the United States, prevalence has risen from about one in eight in 2007, to one in seven in 2021. Researchers estimate that by 2040, Kidney diseases will become the 5th highest cause of death globally. Researchers estimate that by 2040, Kidney diseases will become the 5th highest cause of death globally.

== Causes ==
Deaths due to kidney diseases per million persons in 2012 16–61 62–79 80–88 89–95 96–110 111–120 121–135 136–160 161–186 187–343

Causes of kidney disease include deposition of the Immunoglobulin A antibodies in the glomerulus, administration of analgesics, xanthine oxidase deficiency, toxicity of chemotherapy agents, and a long-term exposure to lead or its salts. Chronic conditions that can produce nephropathy include systemic lupus erythematosus, as well as diabetes mellitus and high blood pressure (hypertension), which lead to diabetic nephropathy and hypertensive nephropathy, respectively.

=== Autosomal dominant polycystic kidney disease ===
Autosomal dominant polycystic kidney disease (ADPKD) is the most common genetic disease, affecting a half million Americans. The clinical phenotype can result from at least two different gene defects. One gene that can cause ADPKD has been located on the short arm of chromosome 16.

=== IgA nephropathy ===
IgA nephropathy is the most common glomerulonephritis throughout the world Primary IgA nephropathy is characterized by deposition of the IgA antibody in the glomerulus. The classic presentation (in 40–50% of the cases) is episodic frank hematuria which usually starts within a day or two of a non-specific upper respiratory tract infection (hence synpharyngitic) as opposed to post-streptococcal glomerulonephritis which occurs some time (weeks) after initial infection. Less commonly gastrointestinal or urinary infection can be the inciting agent. All of these infections have in common the activation of mucosal defenses and hence IgA antibody production.

=== Polycystic disease of the kidneys ===
Additional possible cause of nephropathy is due to the formation of cysts or pockets containing fluid within the kidneys. These cysts become enlarged with the progression of aging causing renal failure. Cysts may also form in other organs including the liver, brain, and ovaries. Polycystic kidney disease is a genetic disease caused by mutations in the PKD1, PKD2, and PKHD1 genes. This disease affects about half a million people in the US. Polycystic kidneys are susceptible to infections and cancer.

=== Xanthine oxidase deficiency ===
Another possible cause of kidney disease is due to decreased function of xanthine oxidase in the purine degradation pathway. Xanthine oxidase will degrade hypoxanthine to xanthine and then to uric acid. Xanthine is not very soluble in water; therefore, an increase in xanthine forms crystals (which can lead to kidney stones) and result in damage to the kidney. Xanthine oxidase inhibitors, like allopurinol, can cause nephropathy.

=== Diabetes ===
Diabetic nephropathy is a progressive kidney disease caused by angiopathy of the capillaries in the glomeruli. It is characterized by nephrotic syndrome and diffuse scarring of the glomeruli. It is particularly associated with poorly managed diabetes mellitus and is a primary reason for dialysis in many developed countries. It is classified as a small blood vessel complication of diabetes.

=== Lupus ===
Despite expensive treatments, lupus nephritis remains a major cause of morbidity and mortality in people with relapsing or refractory lupus nephritis.

=== COVID-19 ===
COVID-19 is associated with kidney disease. In patients hospitalized with COVID-19, the prevalence of acute kidney injury is estimated to be 28%, and the prevalence of renal replacement therapy is estimated to be 9%.

=== Analgesics ===
One cause of nephropathy is the long term usage of pain medications known as analgesics. The pain medicines which can cause kidney problems include Tylenol, aspirin, acetaminophen, paracetamol, and nonsteroidal anti-inflammatory drugs (NSAIDs) such as ibuprofen and naproxen. This form of nephropathy is "chronic analgesic nephritis" or Analgesic Nephropathy, a chronic inflammatory change characterized by loss and atrophy of tubules and interstitial fibrosis and inflammation (BRS Pathology, 2nd ed.).

Specifically, long-term use of the analgesic phenacetin has been linked to renal papillary necrosis (necrotizing papillitis).

=== Iodinated contrast media ===
Kidney disease induced by iodinated contrast media (ICM) is called contrast induced nephropathy (CIN) or contrast-induced acute kidney injury (AKI). Currently, the underlying mechanisms are unclear. But there is a body of evidence that several factors including apoptosis-induction seem to play a role.

=== Toxicity of chemotherapy agents ===
Nephropathy can be associated with some therapies used to treat cancer. The most common form of kidney disease in cancer patients is acute kidney injury (AKI) which can usually be due to volume depletion from vomiting and diarrhea that occur following chemotherapy or occasionally due to kidney toxicities of chemotherapeutic agents. Kidney failure from break down of cancer cells, usually after chemotherapy, is unique to onconephrology. Several chemotherapeutic agents, for example cisplatin, are associated with acute and chronic kidney injuries. Newer agents such as anti-vascular endothelial growth factor (anti-VEGF) are also associated with similar injuries, as well as proteinuria, hypertension, and thrombotic microangiopathy.

=== Lithium ===
Lithium, a medication commonly used to treat bipolar disorder and schizoaffective disorders, can cause nephrogenic diabetes insipidus; its long-term use can lead to nephropathy. Long term lithium treatment is known to cause chronic kidney disease after 10–20 years of treatment in 1-5% of people. End-stage renal disease due to lithium occurs in 0.53% of people versus 0.2% in the general population. Dosing lithium more than once per day is associated with more kidney damage. Kidney harm can be mitigated by dosing lithium once per day at night and keeping the dose as low as possible. Dosing lithium once per day allows for long periods where the kidney is exposed to low levels of lithium, which minimizes kidney harm.

=== Anabolic-androgenic steroids ===
Regular and long-term use of anabolic-androgenic steroids (AAS) can cause both acute and chronic kidney disease through several direct and indirect mechanisms. Focal segmental glomerulosclerosis is the most common condition arising in such cases. Discontinuation of AAS in the early stage of Kidney Disease can result in a reversal of the kidney damage.

=== Diet ===
Higher dietary intake of animal protein, animal fat, and cholesterol may increase risk for microalbuminuria, a sign of kidney function decline, and generally, diets higher in fruits, vegetables, and whole grains but lower in meat and sweets may be protective against kidney function decline. This may be because sources of animal protein, animal fat, and cholesterol, and sweets are more acid-producing, while fruits, vegetables, legumes, and whole grains are more base-producing.

== Diagnosis ==
The standard diagnostic workup of suspected kidney disease includes a medical history, physical examination, a urine test, and an ultrasound of the kidneys (renal ultrasonography). An ultrasound is essential in the diagnosis and management of kidney disease.

== Treatment ==
Treatment approaches for kidney disease focus on managing the symptoms, controlling the progression, and also treating co-morbidities that a person may have.

=== Transplantation ===
Millions of people across the world have kidney disease. Of those millions, several thousand will need dialysis or a kidney transplant at its end-stage. In the United States, as of 2008, 16,500 people needed a kidney transplant. Of those, 5,000 died while waiting for a transplant. Currently, there is a shortage of donors, and in 2007 there were only 64,606 kidney transplants in the world. This shortage of donors is causing countries to place monetary value on kidneys. Countries such as Iran and Singapore are eliminating their lists by paying their citizens to donate. Also, the black market accounts for 5–10 percent of transplants that occur worldwide. The act of buying an organ through the black market is illegal in the United States. To be put on the waiting list for a kidney transplant, patients must first be referred by a physician, then they must choose and contact a donor hospital. Once they choose a donor hospital, patients must then receive an evaluation to make sure they are suitable to receive a transplant. In order to be a match for a kidney transplant, patients must match blood type and human leukocyte antigen factors with their donors. They must also have no reactions to the antibodies from the donor's kidneys.

=== Dialysis ===
Because of the shortage of kidney donors, kidney dialysis is the most common method of renal replacement therapy for patients with kidney failure. Usually it is started at Stage 5 of chronic kidney failure, when the glomerular filtration rate is less than 15% of the normal.

For most patients, a kidney transplant offers a significant survival advantage and improved quality of life compared to remaining on dialysis, often adding years to life expectancy, though early risks exist, especially with certain donor types or in the elderly, but long-term outcomes favor transplant. Studies consistently show better long-term survival rates for transplant recipients, with one-year survival rates often above 90-95% for transplant, while dialysis patients face higher mortality.

== Prognosis ==
Kidney disease can have serious consequences if it cannot be controlled effectively. Generally, the progression of kidney disease is from mild to serious. Some kidney diseases can cause kidney failure.

== Disparities ==
Chronic Kidney Disease has been shown to affect minorities more severely, with 22% of non-Hispanic Black adults living with CKD in the U.S. compared to only 13% of non-Hispanic White adults and 12% Hispanic adults in the U.S. The disparities are even larger when looking at End Stage Kidney Disease (ESKD), where Black Americans were 4 times more likely, Asian Americans 1.6 times more likely, and Hispanic and Native Americans 2 times more likely to develop ESKD than White people. These socioeconomic disparities even carry over to cancer diagnosis and risk for first time kidney transplant recipients, where increased lung cancer risk and higher likelihood of death after cancer diagnosis increased for disadvantaged neighborhoods.

Scientists believe these racial disparities within kidney disease exist due to a complex web of factors, including lower socioeconomic status, food and housing insecurity, reduced access to healthcare, and many more.

The disparity in kidney disease for some population is also related to genetic heritage. Notably, two variants of the APOL1 gene, commonly found in people descending from sub-Saharan African populations, are linked to increased rates of multiple kidney diseases.

Researchers and policy designers are looking at tackling structural racism within the system. A common marker for kidney disease, eGFR, has for decades automatically calculated an increased level for Black patients. Dr. Krohn of the University of Minnesota Medical School states that this change can "makes a Black person’s kidneys seem healthier than they may really be," delaying the time until they seek care and their time on the waitlist for a kidney transplant. In 2026, a study at the Perelman School of Medicine at the University of Pennsylvania, revealed that new blood testing can help identify persons with African ancestry carrying the mutated APOL1 gene. These findings allow clinicians to treat the disease preemptively years before symptoms become apparent.

Other groups, such as the Kidney Disease Screening and Awareness Program (KDSAP), seek to promote earlier detection of kidney disease and awareness through free screenings utilizing college student volunteers in disadvantaged communities.

== See also ==
- Hematologic Diseases Information Service
- Mesoamerican nephropathy, an enigmatic chronic kidney disease of Central America
- Protein toxicity
