= GI/GU =

GI/GU may refer to:

- Human gastrointestinal tract
- Genitourinary system
