= Contrast CT =

Medical imaging technique

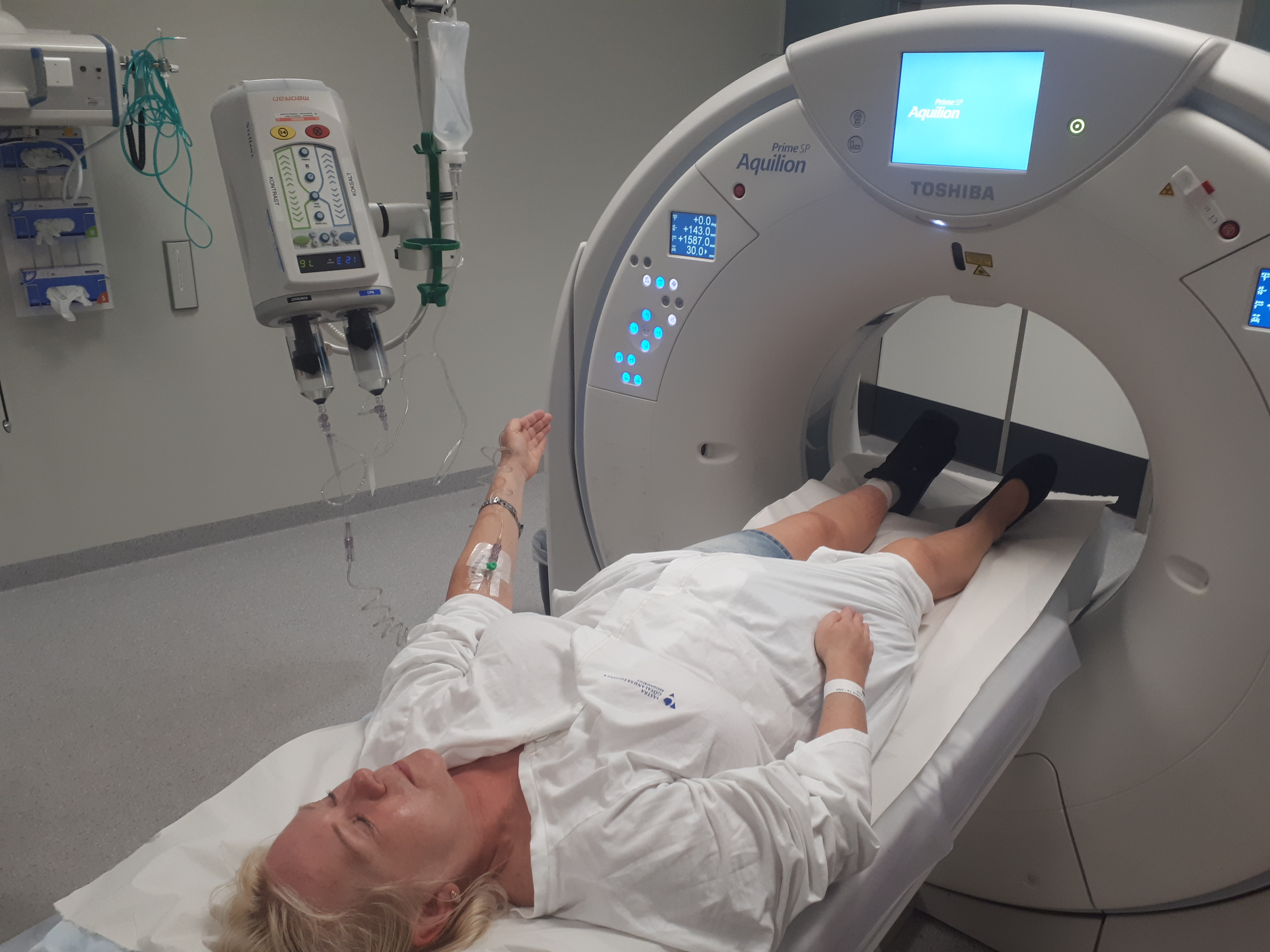
A woman undergoing CT pulmonary angiogram, a contrast CT scan of the pulmonary arteries, because of suspected pulmonary embolism. A contrast delivery system is connected to a peripheral venous catheter in her left arm.

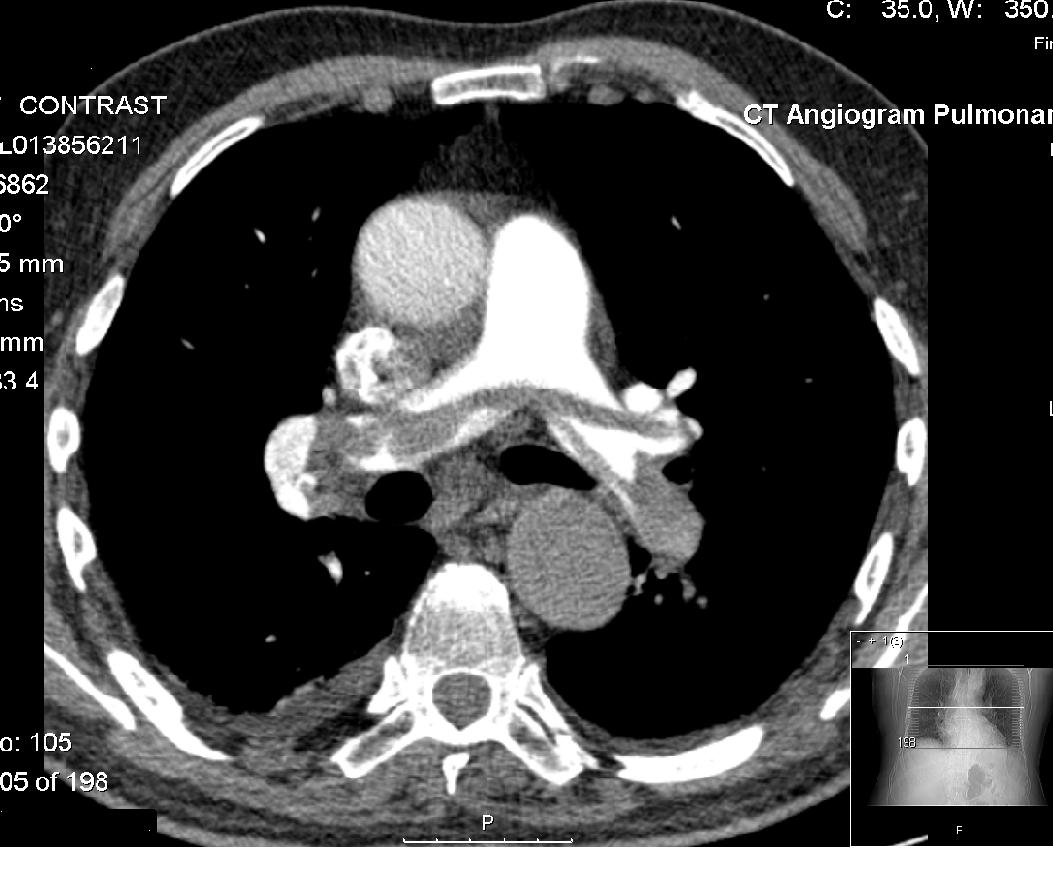
A CT pulmonary angiogram, in this case showing pulmonary embolism of saddle-type, which becomes more radiolucent than the radiocontrast filled blood surrounding it (but it may be indistinguishable without radiocontrast)

Contrast CT, or contrast-enhanced computed tomography (CECT), is X-ray computed tomography (CT) using radiocontrast. Radiocontrasts for X-ray CT are generally iodine-based types. This is useful to highlight structures such as blood vessels that otherwise would be difficult to delineate from their surroundings. Using contrast material can also help to obtain functional information about tissues. Often, images are taken both with and without radiocontrast. CT images are called precontrast or native-phase images before any radiocontrast has been administered, and postcontrast after radiocontrast administration.

== Bolus tracking ==
Volume Rendered Carotid Angiogram

Bolus tracking is a technique to optimize timing of the imaging. A small bolus of radio-opaque contrast media is injected into a patient via a peripheral intravenous cannula. Depending on the vessel being imaged, the volume of contrast is tracked using a region of interest (abbreviated "R.O.I.") at a certain level and then followed by the CT scanner once it reaches this level. Images are acquired at a rate as fast as the contrast moving through the blood vessels.

This method of imaging is used primarily to produce images of arteries, such as the aorta, pulmonary artery, cerebral, carotid and hepatic arteries.

== Washout ==
"Washout" is where tissue loads radiocontrast during arterial phase, but then returns to a rather hypodense state in venous or later phases. This is a property of for example hepatocellular carcinoma as compared to the rest of the liver parenchyma.

== Phases ==
Depending on the purpose of the investigation, there are standardized protocols for time intervals between intravenous radiocontrast administration and image acquisition, in order to visualize the dynamics of contrast enhancements in different organs and tissues. The main phases thereof are as follows:

Phase	Time from injection	Time from bolus tracking	Targeted structures and findings
Non-enhanced CT (NECT)	-	-	Calcifications; Fat in tumors such as in adrenocortical adenomas; Fat-stranding as seen in inflammation such as appendicitis, diverticulitis and omental infarction
Pulmonary arterial phase	6–13 sec	-	Pulmonary embolism (can use bolus tracking in pulmonary trunk + 6 seconds)
Pulmonary venous phase	17–24 sec	-	
Early systemic arterial phase	15–20 sec	immediately	Arteries, without enhancement of organs and other soft tissues.
Late systemicarterial phase Sometimes also called "arterial phase" or "early venous portal phase"	35–40 sec	15–20 sec	All structures that get their blood supply from the arteries have optimal enhancement.; Some enhancement of the portal vein
Pancreatic phase	30 or 40 – 50 sec	20–30 sec	Pancreatic cancers become hypodense compared to the parenchyma.
Hepatic (most accurate) or late portal phase	70–80 sec	50–60 sec	Liver parenchyma enhances through portal vein supply, normally with some enhancement of the hepatic veins.
Nephrogenic phase	100 sec	80 sec	All of the renal parenchyma enhances, including the medulla, allowing detection of small renal cell carcinomas
Systemic venous phase	180 sec	160 sec	Detect venous thrombosis
Delayed phase Sometimes called "wash out phase" or "equilibrium phase"	6–15 minutes	6–15 minutes	Disappearance of contrast in all abdominal structures except for tissue with fibrosis, which appears more radiodense.

== Angiography ==
CT angiography is a contrast CT taken at the location and corresponding phase of the blood vessels of interest, in order to detect vascular diseases. For example, an abdominal aortic angiography is taken in the arterial phase in the abdominal level, and is useful to detect for example aortic dissection.

== Amount ==
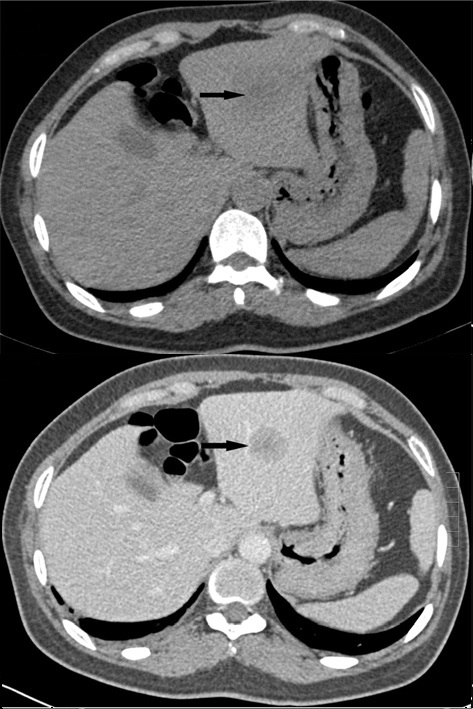
Hepatocellular carcinoma, without (top) and with (bottom) IV contrast

=== Adults ===
The following table shows the preferable volume in normal weight adults. However, dosages may need to be adjusted or even withheld in patients with risks of iodinated contrast, such as hypersensitivity reactions, contrast-induced nephropathy, effects on thyroid function or adverse drug interactions.

Sufficient volume for normal weight adults
Exam		Iodine concentration			Comments
Exam		300 mg/ml	350 mg/ml	370 mg/ml	Comments
CT of brain		95ml	80 ml	75 ml	
CT of thorax	Overall	70–95 ml (Note: 0.3–0.4 gI/kg in a 70kg individual, according to: Iezzi, Roberto; Larici, Anna Rita; Franchi, Paola; Marano, Riccardo; Magarelli, Nicola; Posa, Alessandro; Merlino, Biagio; Manfredi, Riccardo; Colosimo, Cesare (2017). "Tailoring protocols for chest CT applications: when and how?". Diagnostic and Interventional Radiology. 23 (6): 420–427. doi:10.5152/dir.2017.16615. ISSN 1305-3825. PMC 5669541. PMID 29097345.)	60–80 ml	55–75 ml	Parenchymal changes of the lung can often be evaluated adequately without the use of intravenous contrast.
CT of thorax	CT pulmonary angiogram	20 ml (Note: Using dual energy CTA (such as 90/150SnkVp), according to: Leroyer, Christophe; Meier, Andreas; Higashigaito, Kai; Martini, Katharina; Wurnig, Moritz; Seifert, Burkhardt; Keller, Dagmar; Frauenfelder, Thomas; Alkadhi, Hatem (2016). "Dual Energy CT Pulmonary Angiography with 6g Iodine—A Propensity Score-Matched Study". PLOS ONE. 11 (12) e0167214. Bibcode:2016PLoSO..1167214M. doi:10.1371/journal.pone.0167214. ISSN 1932-6203. PMC 5132396. PMID 27907049.)	17 ml	15 ml	Minimal amount when using specific low-contrast protocol.
CT of abdomen	Overall	70 ml	60 ml	55 ml	
CT of abdomen	Liver	55 ml (Note: The liver generally needs an enhancement of at least 30 HU for proper evaluation according to: Multislice CT (3 ed.). Springer-Verlag Berlin and Heidelberg GmbH & Co. KG. 2010. ISBN 978-3-642-06968-0.; In males at 30 years of age, there is an estimated 0.027 HU of liver parenchymal enhancement per kilogram of body weight and per gram of iodine, when injected at 4 ml per second, according to: Bae, Kyongtae T. (2010). "Intravenous Contrast Medium Administration and Scan Timing at CT: Considerations and Approaches". Radiology. 256 (1): 32–61. doi:10.1148/radiol.10090908. ISSN 0033-8419. PMID 20574084.; This example takes the example of a man with a typical weight of 70 kg.)	45 ml	40–45 ml	Minimal required amount.
CT angiography		25 ml (Note: CT-angiography in a 70kg person, with 100-150 mg I/kg by using 80 kVp, mAs-compensation for constant CNR, fixed injection duration adapted to scan time, automatic bolus tracking and a saline chaser, according to: Nyman, Ulf (2012). "Contrast Medium-Induced Nephropathy (CIN) Gram-Iodine/GFR Ratio to Predict CIN and Strategies to Reduce Contrast Medium Doses". Coronary Interventions. doi:10.5772/29992. ISBN 978-953-51-0498-8.)	20 ml		When using specific low-contrast protocol.

The dose should be adjusted in those not having normal body weight, and in such cases the adjustment should be proportional to the lean body mass of the person. In obese patients, the Boer formula is the method of choice (at least in those with body mass index (BMI) between 35 and 40):

For men: Lean body mass = (0.407 × W) + (0.267 × H) − 19.2

For women: Lean body mass = (0.252 × W) + (0.473 × H) − 48.3

=== Children ===
Standard doses in children:

Exam	Concentration of iodine	
Exam	300 mg/ml	350 mg/ml
Generally	2.0 ml/kg	1.7 ml/kg
CT of brain, neck or thorax	1.5 ml/kg	1.3 ml/kg

== Adverse effects ==
Iodinated contrast agents may cause allergic reactions, contrast-induced nephropathy, hyperthyroidism and possibly metformin accumulation. However, there are no absolute contraindications to iodinated contrast, so the benefits needs to be weighted against the risks.

As with CT scans in general, the radiation dose can potentially increase the risk of radiation-induced cancer.

The injection of iodinated contrast agents may sometimes lead to its extravasation.

== See also ==
- Computed tomography of the abdomen and pelvis#Contrast administration
