= Bowman–Heidenhain hypothesis =

The Bowman–Heidenhain hypothesis is an early explanation of renal function and urinary secretion.

The hypothesis states that the kidney is first and foremost a secreting gland. According to the theory, glomeruli are merely filters, while the tubules are the true secretory structures. To prove his hypothesis, Rudolph Heidenhain injected methylene blue into an animal's bloodstream, which soon appeared in the urine. More evident proof of this theory is that when the tubules are destroyed, urine becomes watery and urea and other toxic products remain in the blood.

This theory was later merged with the Ludwig theory to form the modern theory.

== Historical development ==
During the nineteenth century, scientists argued about how urine forms in the body. Carl Ludwig said the kidneys filter fluid out of the blood through the glomeruli, and then the renal tubules change that fluid. On the other side, Heidenhain’s experiments pointed to the tubules themselves actually secreting substances. Later on, Joseph Wearn and Alfred Richards ran experiments that backed up the idea of glomerular filtration. Modern understanding recognizes that a point—urine forms through a mix of glomerular filtration, tubular reabsorption, and tubular secretion.
