= Onconephrology =

Onconephrology (from the Ancient Greek onkos (ὄγκος) meaning bulk, mass, or tumor, nephros (νεφρός) meaning kidney, and the suffix -logy (-λογία), meaning "study of") is a specialty in nephrology that deals with the study of kidney diseases in cancer patients. A nephrologist who takes care of patients with cancer and kidney disease is called an onconephrologist. This branch of nephrology encompasses nephrotoxicity associated with existing and novel chemotherapeutics, kidney disease as it pertains to stem cell transplant, paraneoplastic kidney disorders, paraproteinemias (myeloma and amyloidosis), electrolyte disorders associated with cancer, and more as discussed below.

== Scope of practice ==
As onconephrologists are primarily taking care of kidney disease in cancer patients, there are several aspects that are unique to this practice when compared to general nephrology. For example, patients receiving chemotherapy can experience kidney injury from destruction of cancer cells. There are also various complex electrolyte disorders that can occur due to the cancer itself or are side effects of chemotherapeutics. One example, the syndrome of inappropriate antidiuretic hormone (SIADH), a disorder of low serum sodium concentration, was first described in lung cancer and is a common electrolyte disturbance seen in this population. Fluid, electrolytes and acid base disturbances are much more common and often severe in those who receive chemotherapy. Several chemotherapeutic agents – for example cisplatin – are associated with acute and chronic kidney injuries.

Additionally, there is Increased recognition that primary hematological and oncological disorders can have an impact on the kidneys in the form of glomerular disease that can present with proteinuria, hematuria, hypertension, and kidney function decline. Examples include, hematological cancers such as monoclonal gammopathies (paraproteinemias), which can have significant kidney implications in the form of cast nephropathy or systemic light chain amyloidosis. There is also increased recognition of paraneoplastic glomerular diseases such as membranous nephropathy and minimal change disease which can be as a result of occult malignancy.

Onco-nephrology also encompasses kidney diseases that are unique to bone marrow transplant (stem cell transplant or SCT) which are frequently seen in cancer patients. Certain kidney diseases associated with SCT include Graft-versus-host disease, sinusoidal obstruction syndrome, and thrombotic microangiopathy.

== Acute kidney injury in cancer patients ==
Acute kidney injury (AKI) is a commonly feared complication in cancer patients as it can interrupt life saving therapy and potentially have mortality implications. The exact incidence of AKI in this population can vary. In one retrospective study of a single center ICU the risk was as high as 6% and 60 day survival was low as 14% in those requiring dialysis. AKI in this population can be due to volume depletion from vomiting and diarrhea that occur following chemotherapy or occasionally due to kidney toxicities of chemotherapeutic agents. Less frequently AKI can occur due to obstruction to urine flow from tumor, lymph node enlargement, or due to vascular microthrombi as seen in thrombotic microangiopathies such as thrombotic thrombocytopenic purpura and atypical hemolytic uremic syndrome. Newer agents such as anti-vascular endothelial growth factor (anti-VEGF) are also associated with similar injuries, as well as proteinuria, hypertension, and thrombotic microangiopathy. Additionally, cancer cells can cause AKI by infiltrating the kidney or by precipitating with in the tubules as seen in paraproteinemias.

== Chronic kidney disease in cancer patients ==
With more effective management options for cancer patients, there are far more cancer survivors with residual decline in kidney function from the causes mentioned above. Patients with cancer and chronic kidney disease (CKD) have significantly lower survival than the general population. One area of substantial interest is the estimation of kidney function in cancer patients, as it has direct impact on chemotherapy dosing, selection, and eligibility for chemotherapeutics. Overestimating kidney function can lead to overdosing and drug toxicity while underestimating kidney function can prevent patients from receiving key novel therapies. Further studies are necessary to determine the most accurate estimation formula of renal function. Overall, a collaborative approach with oncologists and onconephrologists are important in managing CKD and addressing concerns such as renal replacement therapy and transplant in this population.

== Management ==
Large academic centers in the United States and other countries have started forming an onconephrology related patient approach to manage these complex disorders as above. Therapy can be as simple as limiting offending agents and dose adjustment of chemotherapeutics or as intricate as adding immunosuppressive regimens. Renal Replacement therapy in the form of hemodialysis and continuous renal replacement therapy is also considered in these patients during acute renal failure or diseases leading to end stage renal disease. Active malignancy is generally a contraindication for kidney transplantation, but sometimes can be delayed based on the tumor type and risk of reoccurrence. Immunosuppressive therapy use after transplantation can increase risk of malignancies such as skin cancers and rarely cause post-transplant lymphoproliferative disorders. Some centers may offer kidney transplantation in the setting of monoclonal gammopathy of renal significance but risk of reoccurrence is common. For these reasons, the role of transplantation continues to be an area of active discussion and expansion.

== Specific areas of focus ==
Topics that are usually of interest to onconephrologists are:

1. Electrolyte disorders of malignancy
2. Secondary glomerular diseases of malignancy
3. Cancer related renal complications
4. Chemotherapy related renal complications
5. Myeloma related kidney diseases
6. Renal amyloidosis
7. Thrombotic microangiopathy and all its causes and treatment strategies (HUS/TTP)
8. Bone marrow transplant related kidney diseases
9. Radiation nephropathy
10. Tumor lysis syndrome
11. Acute kidney injury in the hospitalized cancer patient.
12. The ethics of dialysis in the dying cancer patient
13. Dialysis and chemotherapy agents
14. Tumor invasion of the kidney
15. Obstructive renal disease
16. Chronic kidney disease related to cancer and therapy
17. Renal cell cancer
18. CKD following nephrectomy
19. Targeted therapy and immunotherapy associated kidney toxicities

== Training ==
To be considered an onconephrologist one must complete medical school, an internal medicine residency, and a general nephrology subspecialty training. After general nephrology, one may consider an optional subspecialty training in onconephrology in a few select academic centers that offer the 3rd year track. Centers that offer this training include Memorial Sloan Kettering, MD Anderson, Northwell Health( Hofstra), Mayo Clinic, and the University of Toronto. Currently, no board certification process exists and this additional year of training is optional.

== Literature ==
Several textbooks have been written on this topic. Onconephrology: Cancer, Chemotherapy and the Kidney by Jhaveri and Salahudeen by Springer and Cancer and the Kidney by Cohen by Oxford Univ Press In addition, the American Society of Nephrology formed the first ever Onconephrology Forum (ONF) under the leadership of Salahudeen and Bonventre focusing on onconephrology at national levels. There is a journal dedicated to this field called the Journal of Onconephrology (JON).

== American Society of Onconephrology ==
The American Society of Onconephrology (ASON) was co-founded in 2021, by Shruti Gupta, Kenar D. Jhaver, Arash Rashidi and Biruh T. Workeneh. The official mission per their website is to promote research, clinical activities, and education related to onconephrology.
