= Assessment of kidney function =

Ways of assessing the function of the kidneys

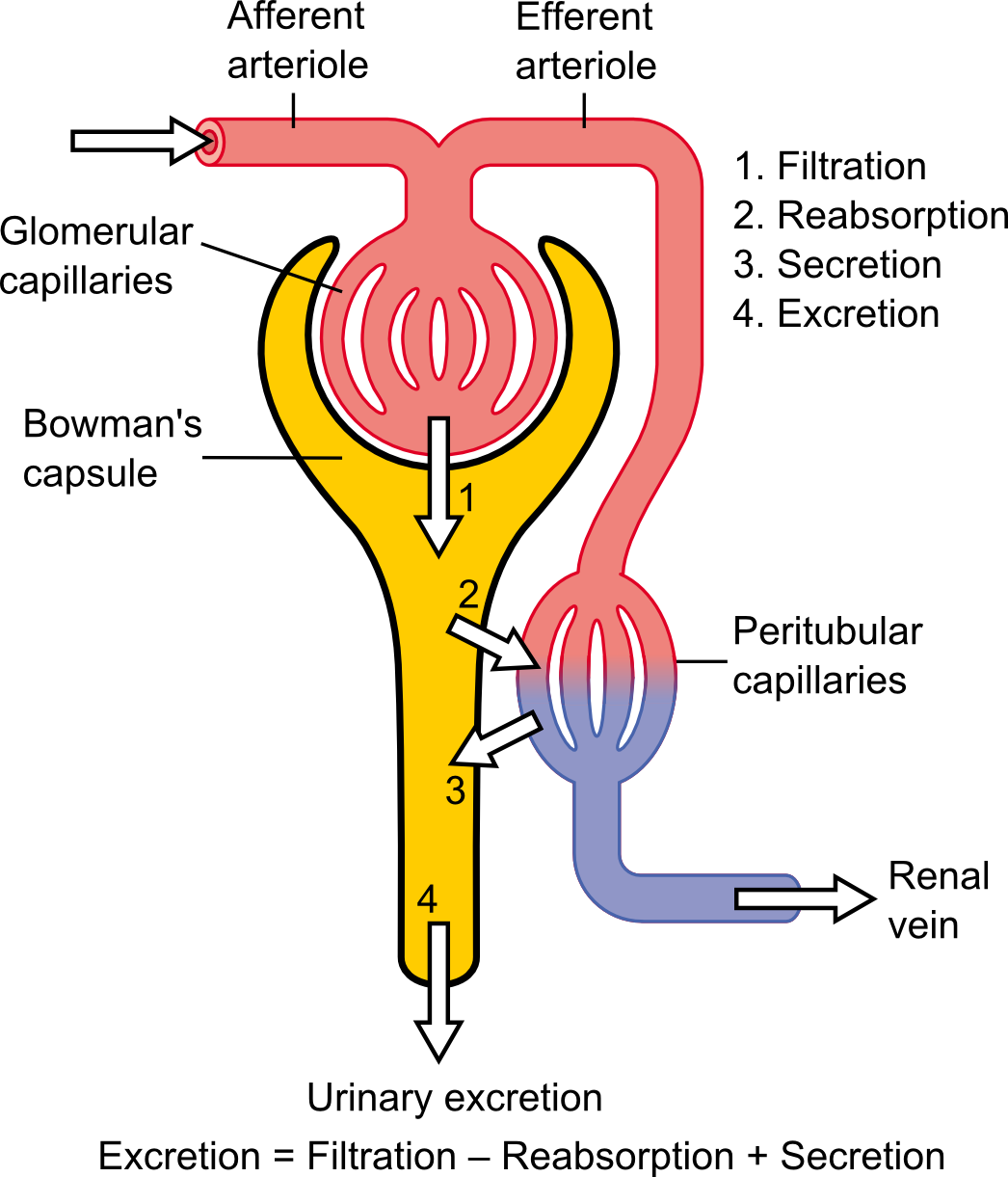
Diagram showing a schematic nephron and its blood supply. The basic physiologic mechanisms of handling fluid and electrolytes by the nephron—filtration, secretion, reabsorption, and excretion—are labelled.

Assessment of kidney function occurs in different ways, using the presence of symptoms and signs, as well as measurements using urine tests, blood tests, and medical imaging.

Functions of a healthy kidney include maintaining a person's fluid balance, maintaining an acid-base balance; regulating sodium and other electrolytes; clearing toxins; regulating blood pressure; and regulating hormones, such as erythropoietin; and activation of vitamin D. The kidney is also involved in maintaining blood pH balance.

== Description ==
The functions of the kidney include maintenance of acid–base balance; regulation of fluid balance; regulation of sodium, potassium, and other electrolytes; clearance of toxins; absorption of glucose, amino acids, and other small molecules; regulation of blood pressure; production of various hormones, such as erythropoietin; and activation of vitamin D.

The glomerular filtration rate (GFR) is regarded as the best overall measure of the kidney's ability to carry out these numerous functions. An estimate of the GFR is used clinically to determine the degree of kidney impairment and to track the progression of the disease. The GFR, however, does not reveal the source of the kidney disease. This is accomplished by urinalysis, measurement of urine protein excretion, kidney imaging, and, if necessary, kidney biopsy.

Much of renal physiology is studied at the level of the nephron—the smallest functional unit of the kidney. Each nephron begins with a filtration component that filters the blood entering the kidney. This filtrate then flows along the length of the nephron, which is a tubular structure lined by a single layer of specialized cells and surrounded by capillaries. The major functions of these lining cells are the reabsorption of water and small molecules from the filtrate into the blood, and the secretion of wastes from the blood into the urine.

Proper function of the kidney requires that it receives and adequately filters blood. This is performed at the microscopic level by many hundreds of thousands of filtration units called renal corpuscles, each of which is composed of a glomerulus and a Bowman's capsule. A global assessment of renal function is often ascertained by estimating the rate of filtration, called the glomerular filtration rate (GFR).

== Clinical assessment ==
Clinical assessment can be used to assess the function of the kidneys. This is because a person with abnormally functioning kidneys may have symptoms that develop. For example, a person with chronic kidney disease may develop oedema due to failure of the kidneys to regulate water balance. They may develop evidence of chronic kidney disease, that can be used to assess its severity, for example high blood pressure, osteoporosis or anaemia. If the kidneys are unable to excrete urea, a person may develop a widespread itch or confusion.

== Urine tests ==
Part of the assessment of kidney function includes the measurement of urine and its contents. Abnormal kidney function may cause too much or too little urine to be produced. The ability of the kidneys to filter protein is often measured, as urine albumin or urine protein levels, measured either at a single instance or, because of variation throughout the day, as 24-hour urine tests.

== Blood tests ==
Blood tests are also used to assess kidney function. These include tests that are intended to directly measure the function of the kidneys, as well as tests that assess the function of the kidneys by looking for evidence of problems associated with abnormal function. One of the measures of kidney function is the glomerular filtration rate (GFR). Other tests that can assess the function of the kidneys include assessment of urea and electrolyte levels such as potassium and phosphate, assessment of acid–base status by the measurement of bicarbonate levels from a vein, and assessment of the full blood count for anaemia.

=== Glomerular filtration rate ===
The glomerular filtration rate (GFR) describes the volume of fluid filtered from the renal (kidney) glomerular capillaries into the Bowman's capsule per unit time. Creatinine clearance (C_{Cr}) is the volume of blood plasma that is cleared of creatinine per unit time and is a useful measure for approximating the GFR. Creatinine clearance exceeds GFR due to creatinine secretion, which can be blocked by cimetidine. Both GFR and C_{Cr} may be accurately calculated by comparative measurements of substances in the blood and urine, or estimated by formulas using just a blood test result (eGFR and eC_{Cr}) The results of these tests are used to assess the excretory function of the kidneys. Staging of chronic kidney disease is based on categories of GFR as well as albuminuria and cause of kidney disease.

Central to the physiologic maintenance of GFR is the differential basal tone of the afferent and efferent arterioles (see diagram). In other words, the filtration rate is dependent on the difference between the higher blood pressure created by vasoconstriction of the input or afferent arteriole versus the lower blood pressure created by lesser vasoconstriction of the output or efferent arteriole.

GFR is equal to the renal clearance ratio when any solute is freely filtered and is neither reabsorbed nor secreted by the kidneys. The rate therefore measured is the quantity of the substance in the urine that originated from a calculable volume of blood. Relating this principle to the below equation—for the substance used, the product of urine concentration and urine flow equals the mass of substance excreted during the time that urine has been collected. This mass equals the mass filtered at the glomerulus as nothing is added or removed in the nephron. Dividing this mass by the plasma concentration gives the volume of plasma which the mass must have originally come from, and thus the volume of plasma fluid that has entered Bowman's capsule within the aforementioned period of time. The GFR is typically recorded in units of volume per time, e.g., milliliters per minute (mL/min). Compare to filtration fraction.

$$GFR = \frac { \mbox{Urine Concentration} \times \mbox{Urine Flow} }{ \mbox{Plasma Concentration} }$$

There are several different techniques used to calculate or estimate the glomerular filtration rate (GFR or eGFR). The above formula only applies for GFR calculation when it is equal to the clearance rate.

The normal range of GFR, adjusted for body surface area, is 100–130 average 125 (mL/min)/(1.73 m^{2}) in men and 90–120 (mL/min)/(1.73 m^{2}) in women younger than the age of 40. In children, GFR measured by inulin clearance is 110 (mL/min)/(1.73 m^{2}) until 2 years of age in both sexes, and then it progressively decreases. After age 40, GFR decreases progressively with age, by 0.4–1.2 mL/min per year.

Estimated GFR (eGFR) is now recommended by clinical practice guidelines and regulatory agencies for routine evaluation of GFR whereas measured GFR (mGFR) is recommended as a confirmatory test when more accurate assessment is required.

== Medical imaging ==
The kidney function can also be assessed with medical imaging. Some forms of imaging, such as kidney ultrasound or CT scans, may assess kidney function by indicating chronic disease that can impact function, by showing a small or shrivelled kidney.. Other tests, such as nuclear medicine tests, directly assess the function of the kidney by measuring the perfusion and excretion of radioactive substances through the kidneys.

== Kidney function in disease ==
A decreased renal function can be caused by many types of kidney disease. Upon presentation of decreased renal function, it is recommended to perform a history and physical examination, as well as performing a renal ultrasound and a urinalysis. The most relevant items in the history are medications, edema, nocturia, gross hematuria, family history of kidney disease, diabetes and polyuria. The most important items in a physical examination are signs of vasculitis, lupus erythematosus, diabetes, endocarditis and hypertension.

A urinalysis is helpful even when not showing any pathology, as this finding suggests an extrarenal etiology. Proteinuria and/or urinary sediment usually indicates the presence of glomerular disease. Hematuria may be caused by glomerular disease or by a disease along the urinary tract.

The most relevant assessments in a renal ultrasound are renal sizes, echogenicity and any signs of hydronephrosis. Renal enlargement usually indicates diabetic nephropathy, focal segmental glomerular sclerosis or myeloma. Renal atrophy suggests longstanding chronic renal disease.

=== Chronic kidney disease stages ===
Risk factors for kidney disease include diabetes, high blood pressure, family history, older age, ethnic group and smoking. For most patients, a GFR over 60 (mL/min)/(1.73 m^{2}) is adequate. But significant decline of the GFR from a previous test result can be an early indicator of kidney disease requiring medical intervention. The sooner kidney dysfunction is diagnosed and treated the greater chance of preserving remaining nephrons, and preventing the need for dialysis.

CKD stage	GFR level ((mL/min)/(1.73 m^{2}))
Stage 1	≥ 90
Stage 2	60–89
Stage 3	30–59
Stage 4	15–29
Stage 5	< 15

The severity of chronic kidney disease (CKD) is described by six stages; the most severe three are defined by the MDRD-eGFR value, and first three also depend on whether there is other evidence of kidney disease (e.g., proteinuria):

0) Normal kidney function – GFR above 90 (mL/min)/(1.73 m^{2}) and no proteinuria
1) CKD1 – GFR above 90 (mL/min)/(1.73 m^{2}) with evidence of kidney damage
2) CKD2 (mild) – GFR of 60 to 89 (mL/min)/(1.73 m^{2}) with evidence of kidney damage
3) CKD3 (moderate) – GFR of 30 to 59 (mL/min)/(1.73 m^{2})
4) CKD4 (severe) – GFR of 15 to 29 (mL/min)/(1.73 m^{2})
5) CKD5 kidney failure – GFR less than 15 (mL/min)/(1.73 m^{2}) Some people add CKD5D for those stage 5 patients requiring dialysis; many patients in CKD5 are not yet on dialysis.

Note: others add a "T" to patients who have had a transplant regardless of stage.

Not all clinicians agree with the above classification, suggesting that it may mislabel patients with mildly reduced kidney function, especially the elderly, as having a disease. A conference was held in 2009 regarding these controversies by Kidney Disease: Improving Global Outcomes (KDIGO) on CKD: Definition, Classification and Prognosis, gathering data on CKD prognosis to refine the definition and staging of CKD.

== See also ==
- Bowman–Heidenhain hypothesis
- Clearance
- Dialysis
- Filtration fraction
- Kt/V
- Pharmacokinetics
- Renal clearance ratio
- Renal failure
- Standardized Kt/V
- Tubuloglomerular feedback
- Urea reduction ratio
