= Computed tomography of the abdomen and pelvis =

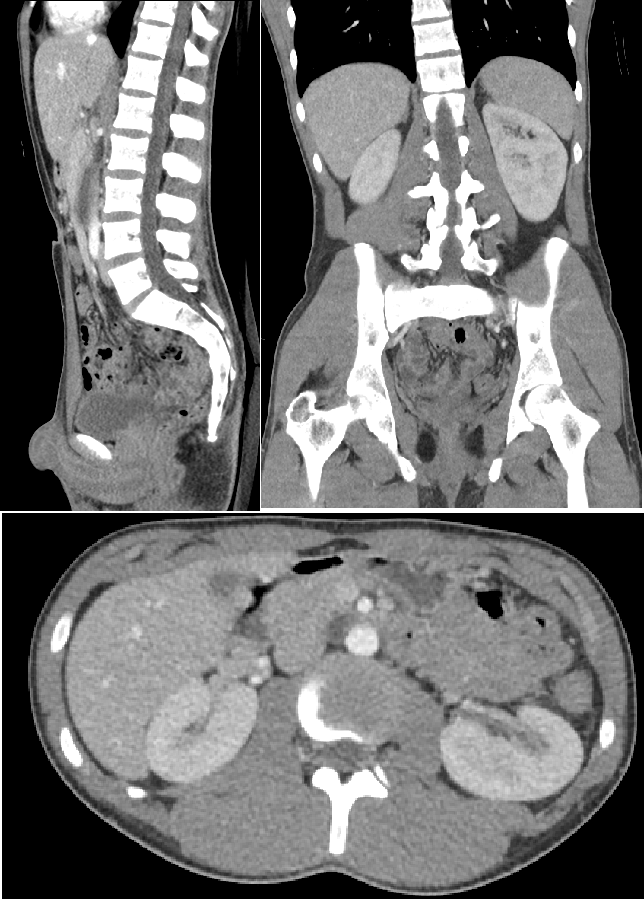
- CT scan of a normal abdomen and pelvis
- ICD-9-CM: 88.01
- OPS-301 code: 3-225-3-226

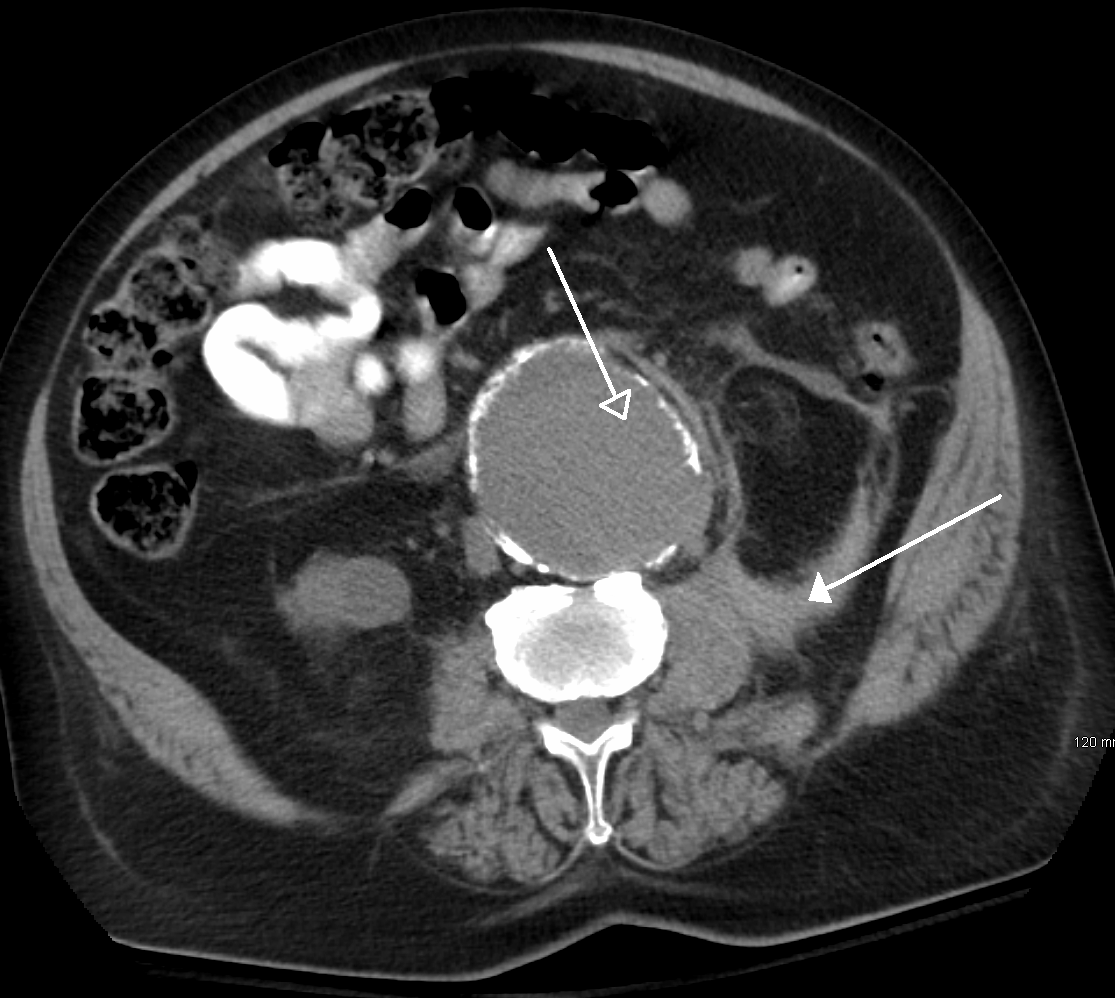
A CT scan image showing a ruptured abdominal aortic aneurysm.

CT Scan of 11 cm Wilms' tumor of right kidney in 13-month-old patient.

Computed tomography of the abdomen and pelvis is an application of computed tomography (CT) and is a sensitive method for diagnosis of abdominal diseases. It is used frequently to determine stage of cancer and to follow progress. It is also a useful test to investigate acute abdominal pain (especially of the lower quadrants, whereas ultrasound is the preferred first line investigation for right upper quadrant pain). Renal stones, appendicitis, pancreatitis, diverticulitis, abdominal aortic aneurysm, and bowel obstruction are conditions that are readily diagnosed and assessed with CT. CT is also the first line for detecting solid organ injury after trauma.

== Advantages ==
Multidetector CT (MDCT) can clearly delineate anatomic structures in the abdomen, which is critical in the diagnosis of internal diaphragmatic and other nonpalpable or unsuspected hernias. MDCT also offers clear detail of the abdominal wall allowing wall hernias to be identified accurately.

== Contrast administration ==
Abdominal imaging is associated with many potential uses for the different phases of contrast CT. The majority of abdominal and pelvic CT's can be performed using a single-phase, but the evaluation of some tumor types (hepatic/pancreatic/renal), the urinary collecting system, and trauma patients among others, may be best performed with multiple phases.

In discussing the numerous phases and indications for CT, best patient care requires individualized CT protocols based upon each patient's specific symptoms, pathology, and underlying co-morbidities. Although labor-intensive, this provides the highest likelihood of an accurate diagnosis with the lowest necessary radiation dose. The following discussion will provide a basic outline of current best practice, but not all clinical scenarios can be accounted for.

Contrast enhanced CT examinations can be acquired at a variety of specific time points after intravenous contrast injection (timing is dependent on the phase of contrast enhancement needed and organ system being evaluated). The timing should be chosen specifically to optimize contrast distribution within the solid organ parenchyma in question.

In cases of suspected bowel leak or perforation, gastrointestinal fistula, interloop abscess or other fluid collection, oncologic staging and surveillance, and CT colonography, oral positive contrast is useful in delineating the lesions. 1% dilute barium solution can be administered orally for bowel preparation for CT scan of the abdomen.

=== Unenhanced CT ===
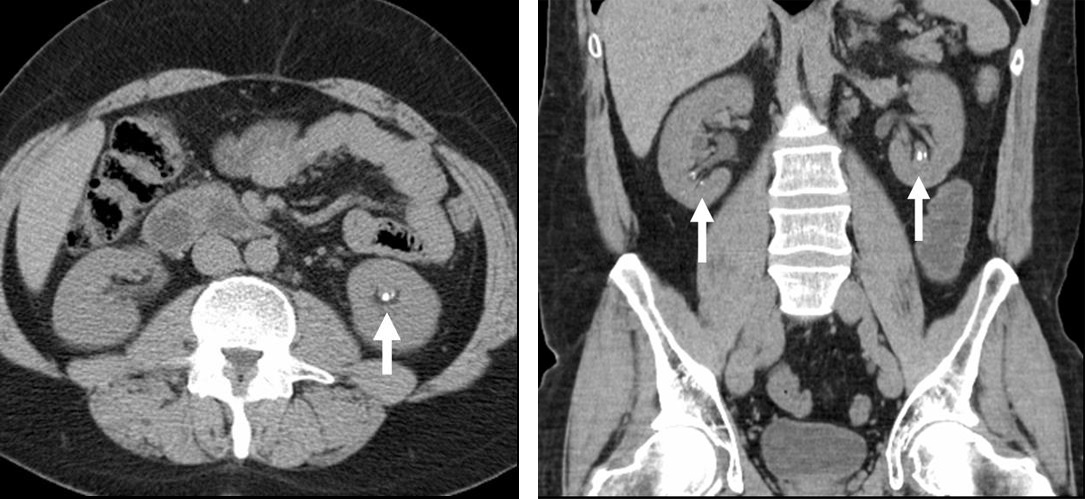
FIGURE 1. Non-contrast CT demonstrating multiple bilateral renal calculi (arrows), which can be obscured on contrast-enhanced images, particularly delayed images when there is excreted contrast in the renal collecting system; axial left, coronal reformat on right.

Non-contrast CT scans Figure 1a (left) and 1b (right) are of limited use for the differentiation of soft tissue structures. However, materials like blood, calcium (renal stones, vascular atherosclerosis), bone, and pulmonary parenchyma are highly visible and can usually be adequately assessed with non-contrast CT. For example, in the abdomen and pelvis, there are several indications for non-contrast imaging. These include: evaluation of renal calculi; assessment for gross intra-abdominal hemorrhage; and post-endostent volume measurements. In addition, non-contrast images are often obtained in conjunction with contrast enhanced images in evaluating potential renal transplant donors and in the evaluation of the pancreas (in combination with contrast phases). Of note, dual-energy CT and the development of virtual "non-contrast" images (VNC imaging) may ultimately obviate the combination scans. Additionally, CT angiography examinations performed for pathologies like aneurysms and dissection are frequently performed in conjunction with non-contrast imaging. The non-contrast images facilitate the differentiation of active extravasation or acute bleeding from vascular calcifications.

=== Portal venous phase ===
The most common technique is to perform portal venous phase imaging in the abdomen and pelvis (approximately 60–90 seconds after contrast administration, figure 2). This results in near optimal contrast opacification of the majority of the solid abdominal organs and it is used for a wide variety of indications: nonspecific abdominal pain; hernia; infection; masses (with a few exceptions such as hypervascular, renal, and some hepatic tumors); and in most follow-up examinations. As a general rule, this single phase is adequate unless there is a specific clinical indication that has been shown to benefit from other phases.

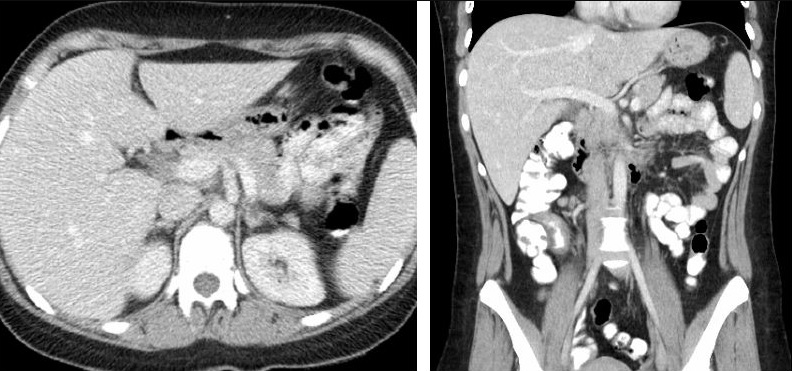
FIGURE 2. Contrast enhanced CT demonstrating parenchymal enhancement of the intra-abdominal organs in the portal venous phase (axial left, coronal reformat right).

=== Early arterial phase (CT angiography) ===
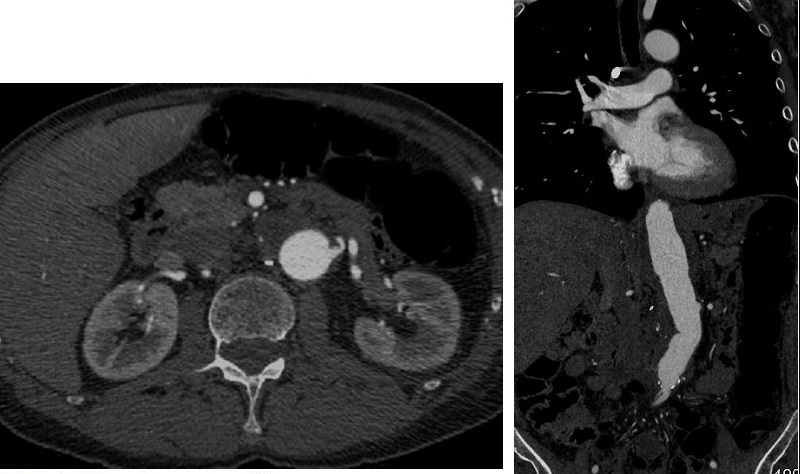
FIGURE 3. Axial (left) and coronal (right) CT angiography images of the abdominal aorta evaluating for aortic aneurysm.

CT angiography (CTA) is highly effective for evaluation of the arterial system, and has largely replaced conventional angiography due to the lower risk profile and ability to survey the entire abdomen. Images are acquired after a rapid bolus of intravenous contrast material (3-7 cc/s) during the arterial phase (15–35 seconds after injection) when the concentration of contrast material in the arterial system is high (figures 3). Images are usually acquired using narrow collimation (<1 mm) and can be retrospectively reconstructed using dedicated 3-dimensional workstations and software. CTA is commonly used in the head and chest in the evaluation of pulmonary emboli, aneurysms, vascular malformations, dissection, bleeding and ischemia. Indications for early arterial phase imaging include: evaluation of aneurysms or dissections (cerebral, aortic, etc.), hepatic, splanchnic or renal arterial anatomy, and arterial imaging in liver or kidney transplantation. Single phase arterial imaging is often used in the evaluation of trauma patients either a complete chest/abdomen/pelvis examination with arterial phase imaging of the chest and portal venous phase imaging of the abdomen/pelvis or just a portal venous phase of abdomen and pelvis depending on the mechanism and severity of the trauma. CTA is also commonly performed in the abdomen and pelvis for evaluating vascular malformations and in the evaluation of bleeding. Mesenteric ischemia can also be evaluated using CT angiography. CTA of the abdomen and pelvis is often performed in combination with a CTA for evaluating the extremity vasculature.

=== Late arterial phase ===
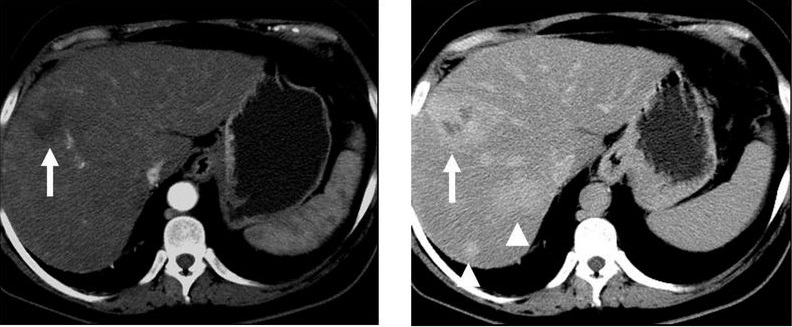
FIGURE 4: Arterial and portal venous phase CT of cholangiocarcinoma. Selected images from a biphasic CT demonstrating early arterial enhancement of a posterior right hepatic lobe mass with mild wash out on delayed phase images in the setting of cirrhosis characteristic of hepatocellular carcinoma.

The late arterial phase is timed to correspond to the peak concentration of contrast material in highly vascular tumors and is performed approximately 20–35 seconds after the injection of intravenous contrast. Early arterial phase imaging is predominantly utilized for angiography and will be discussed separately. Late arterial phase imaging is almost always performed in conjunction with other phases (e.g. portal venous phase) to allow more complete characterization of any identified abnormalities (figure 4). The primary indication for a late arterial phase is for the evaluation of hypervascular tumors of the liver such as hepatocellular carcinoma or hypervascular metastases (figure 4). Typical hypervascular tumors for which this would be used include: hepatocellular carcinoma; renal cell carcinoma; melanoma; carcinoid/neuroendocrine tumors; some sarcomas; choriocarcinoma; and thyroid carcinoma. Although a "hypervascular", biphasic evaluation would generally be used for these patients, note that a single phase is often adequate for follow up imaging.

=== Systemic venous phase ===
CT imaging specific for the venous structures is performed uncommonly. Most venous structures are partially opacified on the routine contrast enhancing images and suffice for most examinations. However, occasionally evaluation of the inferior vena cava is desired, such as prior to IVC filter placement/removal or evaluation of IVC thrombosis.

=== Delayed phase ===
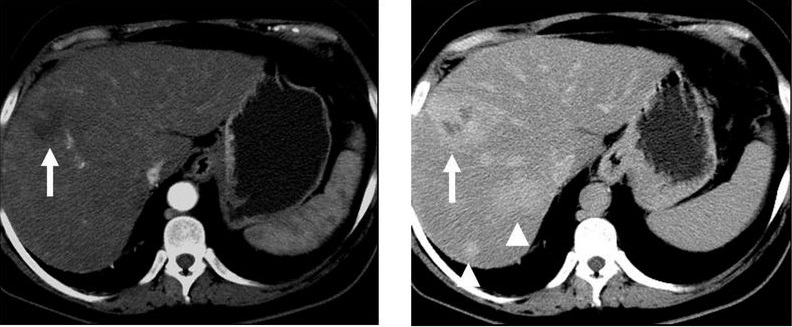
FIGURE 5. Selected images form CT performed using a Cholangiocarcinoma specific protocol. 5a is a portal venous phase image demonstrating a single low attenuation mass which does not appear to enhance. 5b is a 15-minute delayed image which demonstrates delayed enhancement of the liver mass (arrow) characteristic of Cholangiocarcinoma. Several other enhancing masses (arrowheads) are also seen which were not evident on the portal venous phase images.

Delayed phase imaging (figure 5) encompasses scanning at a variety of different times following contrast administration, and depends on the pathology in question. Typical delayed imaging times range from a few minutes to up to 15 minutes or longer. The most common indications for delayed phase imaging are evaluation of the kidneys, collecting system (ureters and bladder) and specific kidney, liver, and adrenal tumors. Evaluation of the kidneys, ureters and bladder are discussed separately in the renal imaging section. Cholangiocarcinoma occurring within the extrahepatic biliary tree or intrahepatic cholangiocarcinomas are a common reason for delayed imaging. Cholangiocarcinomas are fibrotic tumors which enhance slowly, and are usually imaged following a 10-15 minute delay. Similarly, adrenal masses can be evaluated with multiphase imaging including an unenhanced CT, portal venous phase and a 10-minute delay CT which allows for evaluation and calculation of the enhancement and washout characteristics aiding in distinguishing benign adrenal adenomas from other adrenal masses.

Outside of the evaluation of masses, delayed phase images can be used in the evaluation of active vascular extravasation in trauma patients, vascular malformations, and aneurysm disruption.

== Organ-specific considerations ==
=== Liver masses ===
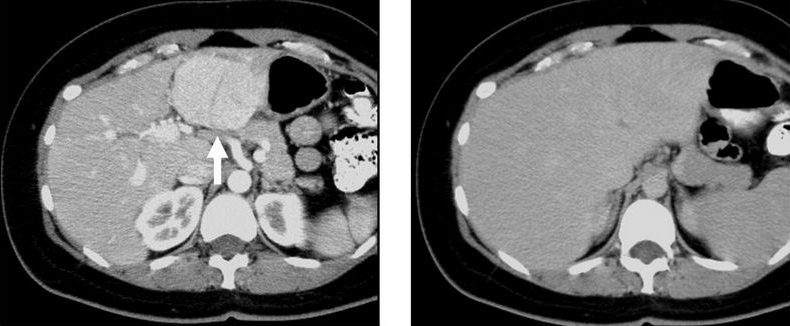
FIGURE 6. Selected images from a biphasic CT of Focal Nodular Hyperplasia in the left hepatic lobe (arrow). These masses have characteristic early arterial enhancement (6a) with contrast wash out on the portal venous phase images (6b) from the mass making these lesions difficult to identify on portal venous phase images alone.

When evaluating hepatic masses, it can be advantageous to have both late arterial and portal venous phase images (biphasic imaging, figure 4) since some tumors enhance briskly during the arterial phase (hepatocellular carcinoma, hepatic adenoma, follicular nodular hyperplasia (FNH), and hypervascular metastasis), but may be occult or difficult to characterize on portal venous phase imaging alone (figure 6). However, it should be stressed that the addition of late arterial phase images is only indicated if one of these tumors is suspected, or if there is a need for further characterization of a hepatic mass, since the large majority of patients will not benefit from the addition of this phase. In addition, if there is a need to definitively characterize a hepatic mass, MRI is generally more sensitive and specific, with no associated radiation dose.

Transient hepatic attenuation differences in the arterial phase may mimic diseases of the liver.

=== Kidney masses ===
Detection and characterization of renal parenchymal masses is a frequent indication for CT. An initial noncontrast CT is important for detecting calcium or fat in a lesion, and to provide baseline attenuation of any renal masses. Following noncontrast scanning, intravenous contrast is injected and a corticomedullary phase is obtained at approximately 70 seconds (figure 7a, 7b). The corticomedullary phase is characterized by enhancement of the renal cortex as well as the renal vasculature. This phase is valuable in the evaluation of benign renal variants, lymphadenopathy and vasculature, however certain medullary renal masses may not be visible during this phase due to minimal enhancement of the medulla and collecting system. The parenchymal phase is obtained approximately 100–200 seconds after the injection of contrast material (figure 7c). Parenchymal phase imaging demonstrates continued enhancement of the cortex, enhancement of the medulla, and various levels of contrast material in the collecting system. The parenchymal phase is highly important for the detection and characterization of renal masses, parenchymal abnormalities, and the renal collecting system. This method of imaging does not evaluate for abnormalities of the collecting system.

Common renal masses can occasionally be differentiated from each other using this imaging technique. Renal cell carcinomas and oncocytomas typically demonstrate intense heterogeneous enhancement on the parenchymal phase images and cannot be reliably differentiated from each other but can be distinguished from other renal masses. Angiomyolipomas (AML's) also demonstrate intense contrast enhancement but characteristically contain macroscopic fat which can be detected on the noncontrast images, and can help to differentiate AML's from renal cell carcinomas and oncocytomas. Renal lymphoma on the other hand, will often have decreased enhancement when compared to the renal parenchyma on the parenchymal phase images.

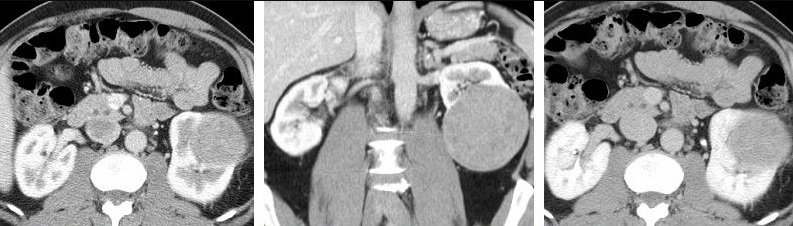
FIGURE 7. Selected images from a renal mass specific protocol CT. Corticomedullary phase (axial 7a) demonstrates peripheral enhancement of the renal cortex with minimal opacification of the renal medulla. There is a large renal cell carcinoma in the left kidney (right in image) which can be differentiated from the normal renal parenchyma by the heterogeneous and differential enhancement. The renal artery and vein are opacified in this phase as well. The collecting system is not opacified (coronal reformat 7b). In the parenchymal phase, the renal cortex and the medulla are enhancing. The renal cell carcinoma in the left kidney is not as well defined when compared to the corticomedullary phase images, but is actually slightly more conspicuous. There is some contrast noted within the collecting system during this phase (7c).

=== CT urography ===
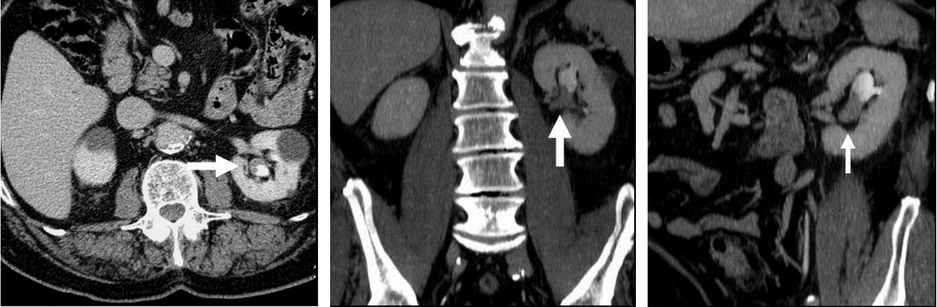
FIGURE 8. Selected images from a CT Urography protocol CT. 8a is an axial CT image from the renal parenchymal phase. There is a mildly enhancing soft tissue mass in the left renal pelvis (arrow) consistent with a transitional cell carcinoma. Figure 8b (coronal reformats) and 8c (left oblique coronal reformats) demonstrate the double bolus technique of CT Urography. These images confirm soft tissue mass (arrows) in the renal pelvis with contrast excretion into the collecting system (arrowheads).

CT urography (CTU) is commonly used in the evaluation of hematuria, and specifically tailored to image the renal collecting system, ureters and bladder in addition to the renal parenchyma. Initial imaging includes a noncontrast phase to detect renal calculi as a source of hematuria. Note that dual energy CT may eventually allow the noncontrast phase to be eliminated. Contrast enhancement techniques for CTU vary from institution to institution. A common technique is a double bolus, single phase imaging algorithm. Excretory phase imaging allows for not only evaluation of the ureteral lumen, but also periureteral abnormalities including external masses and lymphadenopathy.

=== Pancreatic masses ===
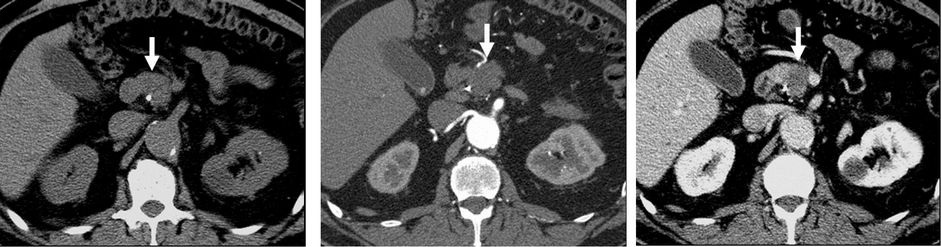
FIGURE 9. Selected images from a pancreatic protocol. 9a is a noncontrast CT image demonstrating subtle fullness in the region of the pancreatic neck (arrow). 9b is a CT image performed during the early arterial phase during which there is opacification of the arterial structure with subtle fullness in the pancreatic neck (arrow). The pancreas is not enhancing during this phase. 9c was performed in a late arterial/pancreatic phase demonstrating normal enhancement of the pancreas (arrowhead) with a hypoenhancing mass (arrow) in the pancreatic neck. The pancreatic mass is more visible during this phase.

Pancreatic masses are often evaluated using both an early arterial (to evaluate for vascular involvement and thus resectability, figure 9a) and a later "pancreatic" phase (which optimizes pancreatic parenchymal enhancement and thus is best at differentiating pancreatic tumors from pancreatic parenchyma, figure 9b). Pancreatic adenocarcinoma typically is hypoenhancing when compared to the surrounding parenchyma. Most other common pancreatic tumors are hypervascular with avid enhancement (such as pancreatic neuroendocrine tumors) and appear brighter than the surrounding pancreatic parenchyma after the injection of intravenous contrast material.

=== Incidental findings ===
CT imaging should be performed to evaluate the specific clinical question, however incidental findings are noted in approximately 5-16 % of patients scanned for an unrelated reasons. It is not acceptable practice to anticipate the possibility of incidental lesions given their low incidence and prospectively add additional phases to routine protocols. Unfortunately, several recent surveys demonstrated that this practice is more common than might be anticipated, and contributes to unnecessary medical radiation exposure to a large population of patients. Even more egregious is the fact that many of these findings could potentially be more accurately evaluated with other non-radiation imaging modalities such as MRI or ultrasound.

Although the management of incidental findings is not the focus of this chapter, some of these findings will require complete characterization with further CT phases such as arterial phase (certain liver tumors) or delayed images (adrenal lesions). Management of incidental findings has been controversial since they are relatively common, especially in the elderly, and more CT scanning may be required for further characterization of what is frequently a benign finding. In an effort to provide guidance on which incidental findings should be appropriately further evaluated and what the appropriate imaging modality should be, the ACR published a white paper on management of incidental findings detected at CT of the abdomen in 2010.

== Conclusion ==
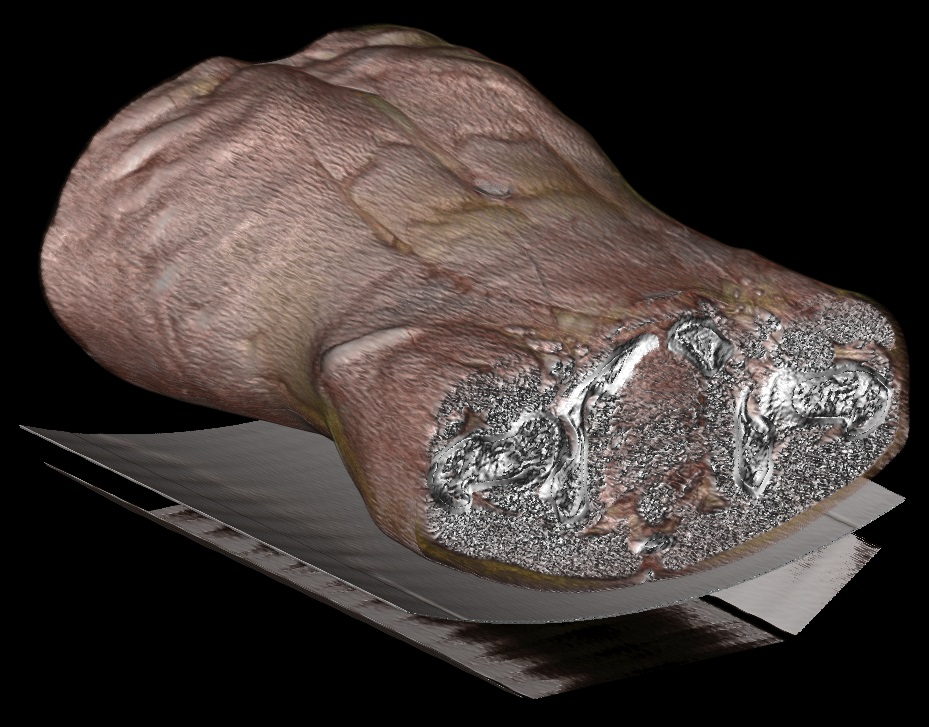
Volume rendering of an abdominal CT.

Multiphase CT examinations are very important for the detection and characterization of certain clinical conditions, but should not be generalized for every patient undergoing CT of the abdomen and pelvis. A recent survey demonstrated that many physicians are routinely performing multiphase CT for the majority of patients in an attempt to prospectively characterize potential lesions detected during the scan. However, unindicated multiphase CT examinations are an important source of medical radiation that does not contribute to the care of patients. Adherence to published standards such as the ACR appropriateness criteria can both decrease medical radiation and optimize imaging for the specific clinical indication.
