= Genitourinary tract injury =

- Specialty: Urology

The genitourinary tract, or simply the urinary tract, consists of the kidneys, ureters, bladder, and the urethra. The kidney is the most frequently injured. Injuries to the kidney commonly occur after automobile or sports-related accidents. A blunt force is involved in 80-85% of injuries. Major decelerations can result in vascular injuries near the kidney's hilum. Gunshots and knife wounds and fractured ribs can result in penetrating injuries to the kidney.

Pelvic fractures can damage the urethra and bladder.

== Presentation ==
=== Comorbidity ===
In 90% of bladder injuries, there is a concurrent pelvic fracture. Pelvic bone fragments penetrate and perforate the bladder. Perforations can be either extraperitoneal or intraperitoneal. Intraperitoneal perforations allow for urine to enter the peritoneal cavity. Symptoms typically develop immediately if the urine is infected. Otherwise sterile urine may take days to cause symptoms.

== Diagnosis ==
=== Hematuria in patients presenting after trauma ===
Blood in the urine after abdominal trauma suggests a urinary tract injury. Renal injuries are suggested by lower rib fractures. Bladder and urethral injuries are suggested by pelvic fractures.

==== Foley catheter ====
The urethral meatus should be examined after trauma. Blood at the urethral meatus precludes insertion of a foley catheter into the bladder. Erroneously placing a foley in this situation can result in infections of periprostatic and perivesical hematomas or conversion of a partial transection to a complete urethral transections. Blood at the urethral meatus suggests an injury to the urethra. Otherwise a foley catheter can be placed into the bladder and hematuria can be assessed for.

==== Abdominal imaging ====
Hemodynamically stable individuals should undergo further radiographic assessment. Abdominal computed tomography (CT) with contrast can detect retroperitoneal hematomas, renal lacerations, urinary extravasation, and renal arterial and venous injuries. A repeat scan ten minutes after the first is recommended.

==== Retrograde urethrography (RUG) ====
The purpose of this study is to identify and characterize injuries to the urethra. The tip of a small (12F) foley catheter is placed in the urethral meatus. The catheter remains fixed after 3 mL of water are instilled into the foley catheter's balloon. Radiographic films are taken as 20 mL of water-soluble contrast material are injected This outlines the urethra from the urethral meatus to the bladder neck. If injuries exist, the location can be determined.

==== Retrograde cystography ====
The purpose of this study is to identify bladder perforations. The bladder needs to be adequately distended with contrast medium. 300 mL or more are generally recommended. The study has two films. One film is taken when the bladder is adequately distended and filled with contrast. The next film is taken after the bladder is emptied without the assistance of a foley catheter.

==== Angiography ====
Helpful in identifying injuries to the kidney's parenchyma and vasculature.

== Management ==
=== Genitourinary trauma ===
==== Urethral injuries ====
Management depends on what part of the urethra was injured and to what extent. The two broad anatomical separations are the posterior and anterior urethra. The posterior urethra includes the prostatic and membranous urethra. The anterior urethra includes the bulbous and pendulous portion.

===== Posterior urethra injuries =====
The membranous urethra can be separated from the prostate's apex after blunt trauma. The urethra should not be catheterized. Initial management should be the creation of a suprapubic cystostomy for urine drainage. The bladder should be opened in the midline so to facilitate inspection of bladder lacerations. Perforations can be closed with absorbable sutures. The suprapubic cystostomy remains in place for three months. Incomplete urethral disruptions heal spontaneously and the suprapubic cystostomy can be removed after three weeks for these injuries. Before removing a cystostomy, a voiding cystourethrography should demonstrate no urine extravasation. Delayed urethral reconstruction may be performed within 3 months. This typically entails a direct excision of the now strictured area and anastomosis of the bulbous urethra to the prostate's apex. A urethral catheter and suprapubic cystostomy should be left in place. These are removed within a month.

== See also ==
- Acute kidney injury
- Genitourinary system
