= Renal clearance ratio =

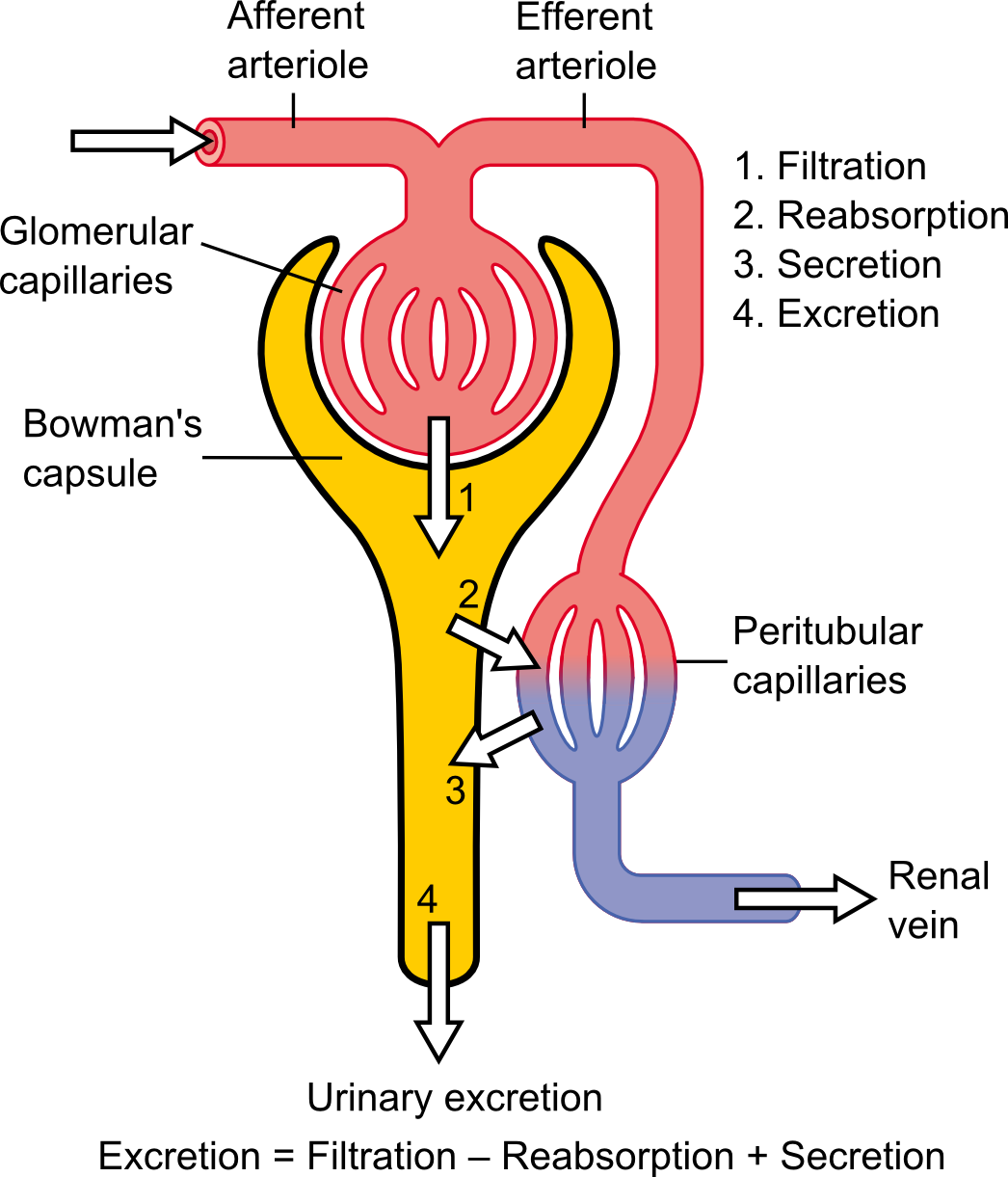
Diagram showing the basic physiologic mechanisms of the kidney

The renal clearance ratio or fractional excretion is a relative measure of the speed at which a constituent of urine passes through the kidneys. It is defined by following equation:

$$clearance\ ratio\ of\ X = \frac{C_x}{C_{in}}$$

- X is the analyte substance
- C_{x} is the renal plasma clearance of X
- C_{in} is the renal plasma clearance of inulin.

Creatinine is sometimes used instead of inulin as the reference substance; for example, the calcium-creatinine clearance ratio is used in an attempt to distinguish between different causes of a high plasma calcium concentration. It is easier to use creatinine rather than inulin as the comparator as creatinine is produced by the body, whereas inulin has to be intravenously infused.

== See also ==
- Clearance (pharmacology)
- Kt/V
