= Acute kidney injury =

Sudden decrease in kidney function that develops within seven days

- Other names: Acute renal failure (ARF), acute kidney failure (AKF)
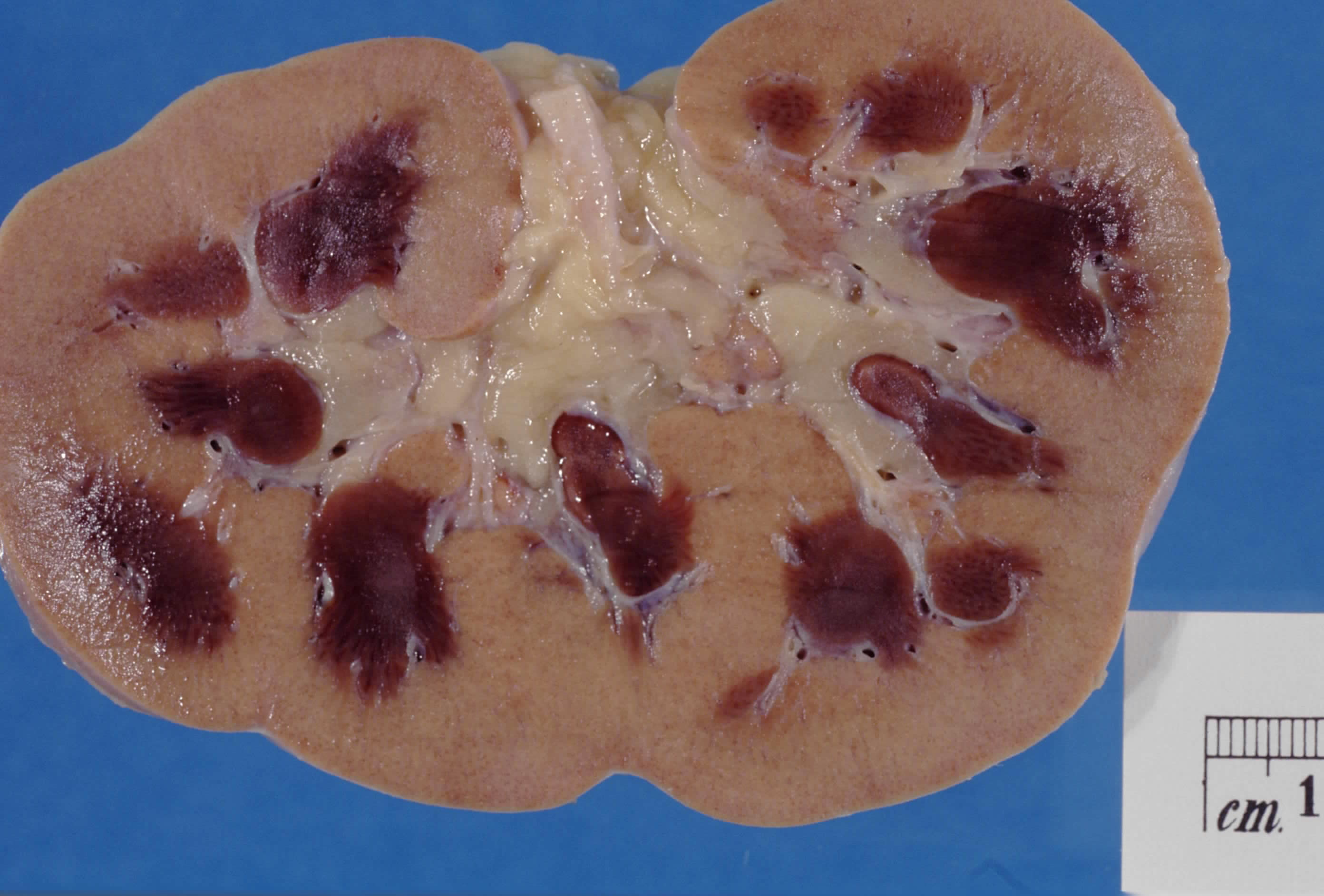
- Pathologic kidney specimen showing marked pallor of the cortex, contrasting to the darker areas of surviving medullary tissue. The patient died with acute kidney injury.
- Specialty: Nephrology, Urology

Acute kidney injury (AKI), previously called acute renal failure, is a sudden decrease in kidney function that develops within seven days, as shown by an increase in serum creatinine or a decrease in urine output, or both.

Causes of AKI are classified as either prerenal (due to decreased blood flow to the kidney), intrinsic renal (due to damage to the kidney itself), or postrenal (due to blockage of urine flow). Prerenal causes of AKI include sepsis, dehydration, excessive blood loss, cardiogenic shock, heart failure, cirrhosis, and certain medications such as ACE inhibitors or NSAIDs. Intrinsic renal causes of AKI include glomerulonephritis, lupus nephritis, acute tubular necrosis, certain antibiotics, and chemotherapeutic agents. Postrenal causes of AKI include kidney stones, bladder cancer, neurogenic bladder, enlargement of the prostate, narrowing of the urethra, and certain medications such as anticholinergics.

The diagnosis of AKI is made based on a person's signs and symptoms, along with laboratory tests measuring serum creatinine and urine output. Other tests include urine microscopy and urine electrolytes. Renal ultrasound can be obtained when a postrenal cause is suspected. A kidney biopsy may be obtained when intrinsic renal AKI is suspected, and the cause is unclear.

AKI is seen in 10–15% of people admitted to the hospital and in more than 50% of people admitted to the intensive care unit. AKI may lead to several complications, including metabolic acidosis, high potassium levels, uremia, changes in body fluid balance, effects on other organ systems, and death. People who have experienced AKI are at increased risk of developing chronic kidney disease in the future. Management includes treatment of the underlying cause and supportive care, such as renal replacement therapy.

== Signs and symptoms ==
The underlying cause often dominates the clinical presentation. The symptoms of acute kidney injury result from various disturbances in kidney function that are associated with the disease. Accumulation of urea and other nitrogen-containing substances in the bloodstream lead to a number of symptoms, such as fatigue, loss of appetite, headache, nausea, and vomiting. Marked increases in the potassium level can lead to abnormal heart rhythms, which can be severe and life-threatening. Fluid balance is frequently affected, though blood pressure can be high, low, or normal.

Pain in the flanks may be encountered in some conditions (such as clotting of the kidneys' blood vessels or inflammation of the kidney). This is the result of stretching of the fibrous tissue capsule surrounding the kidney. If the kidney injury is the result of dehydration, thirst or evidence of fluid depletion may be seen on physical examination. Physical examination may also provide other clues as to the underlying cause of the kidney problem, such as a rash in interstitial nephritis (or vasculitis) and a palpable bladder in obstructive nephropathy.

== Causes ==
=== Prerenal ===
Prerenal causes of AKI ("prerenal azotemia") are those that decrease effective blood flow to the kidney and cause a decrease in the glomerular filtration rate (GFR). Both kidneys need to be affected, as one kidney is still more than adequate for normal kidney function. Notable causes of prerenal AKI include low blood volume (e.g., dehydration), low blood pressure, heart failure (leading to cardiorenal syndrome), hepatorenal syndrome in the context of liver cirrhosis, and local changes to the blood vessels supplying the kidney (e.g. NSAID-induced vasoconstriction of afferent arteriole). The latter includes renal artery stenosis, or the narrowing of the renal artery which supplies the kidney with blood, and renal vein thrombosis, which is the formation of a blood clot in the renal vein that drains blood from the kidney.

=== Intrinsic or intrarenal ===
Intrinsic AKI refers to disease processes that directly damage the kidney itself. It can be due to one or more of the kidney's structures, including the glomeruli, kidney tubules, or the interstitium. Common causes of each are glomerulonephritis, acute tubular necrosis, and acute interstitial nephritis, respectively. Other causes of intrinsic AKI are rhabdomyolysis and tumor lysis syndrome. Certain medication classes such as antibiotics (e.g. amoxicillin/clavulanic acid) and calcineurin inhibitors (e.g., tacrolimus) can also directly damage the tubular cells of the kidney and result in a form of intrinsic AKI.

=== Postrenal ===
Postrenal AKI refers to acute kidney injury caused by disease states downstream of the kidney and most often occurs as a consequence of urinary tract obstruction. This may be related to:

- Benign prostatic hyperplasia
- Kidney stones
- Obstructed urinary catheter
- Bladder stones
- Cancer of the bladder, ureters, or prostate
- Damage to the nerves controlling urine flow and bladder function

== Diagnosis ==
=== Definition ===
Introduced by the KDIGO in 2012, specific criteria exist for the diagnosis of AKI.

AKI can be diagnosed if any one of the following is present:

- Increase in SCr by ≥0.3 mg/dl (≥26.5 μmol/L) within 48 hours
- Increase in SCr to ≥1.5 times baseline, which has occurred within the prior 7 days
- Urine volume < 0.5 mL/kg/h for 6 hours

=== Staging ===
The RIFLE criteria, proposed by the Acute Dialysis Quality Initiative group, aid in assessing the severity of a person's acute kidney injury. The acronym RIFLE is used to define the spectrum of progressive kidney injury seen in AKI:

Pathophysiology of acute kidney injury in the proximal renal tubule

- Risk: A 1.5-fold increase in serum creatinine, or a glomerular filtration rate (GFR) decrease by 25%, or urine output <0.5 mL/kg per hour for six hours.
- Injury: Two-fold increase in the serum creatinine, or GFR decrease by 50%, or urine output <0.5 mL/kg per hour for 12 hours
- Failure: Three-fold increase in the serum creatinine, or GFR decrease by 75%, or urine output of <0.3 mL/kg per hour for 24 hours, or no urine output (anuria) for 12 hours
- Loss: Complete loss of kidney function (e.g., need for renal replacement therapy) for more than 4 weeks
- End-stage kidney disease: Complete loss of kidney function (e.g., need for renal replacement therapy) for more than 3 months

=== Evaluation ===
A measurable decrease in urine output may signal deterioration of kidney function. Often, it is diagnosed based on blood tests for substances normally eliminated by the kidneys - urea and creatinine. Additionally, the ratio of BUN to creatinine is used to evaluate kidney injury. Both tests have their disadvantages. For instance, about 24 hours are needed for the creatinine level to rise, even if both kidneys have ceased to function. Several alternative markers have been proposed (such as NGAL, HAVCR1, IL18, and cystatin C), but none is sufficiently established as of 2018 to replace creatinine as a marker of kidney function.

These may include urine sediment analysis, kidney ultrasound, and/or kidney biopsy. Indications for kidney biopsy in the setting of AKI include the following:

1. Unexplained AKI in a patient with two nonobstructed, normally sized kidneys
2. AKI in the presence of the nephritic syndrome
3. Systemic disease associated with AKI
4. Kidney transplant dysfunction

In medical imaging, acute changes in the kidney are often examined with renal ultrasonography (US) as the first-line modality, where CT scan and magnetic resonance imaging (MRI) are used for follow-up examinations and when US fails to demonstrate abnormalities. In the evaluation of the acute changes in the kidney, the echogenicity of the renal structures, delineation of the kidney, renal vascularity, kidney size, and focal abnormalities are observed. CT is preferred in renal traumas, but US is used for follow-up, especially in the patients suspected for the formation of urinomas. A CT scan of the abdomen can also demonstrate bladder distension or hydronephrosis.

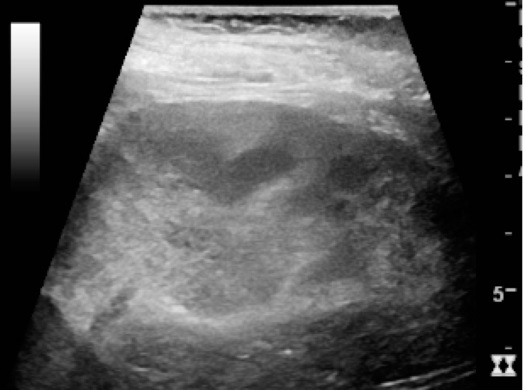
Renal ultrasonograph of acute pyelonephritis with increased cortical echogenicity and blurred delineation of the upper pole

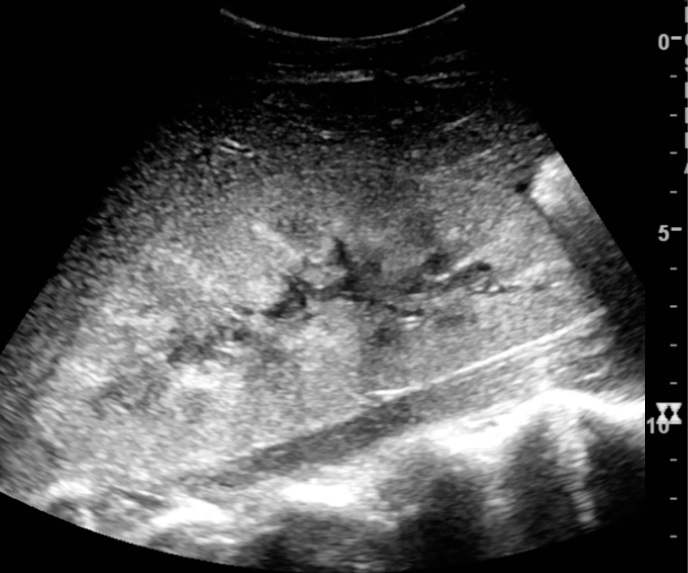
Renal ultrasonograph in renal failure after surgery with increased cortical echogenicity and kidney size. Biopsy showed acute tubular necrosis.

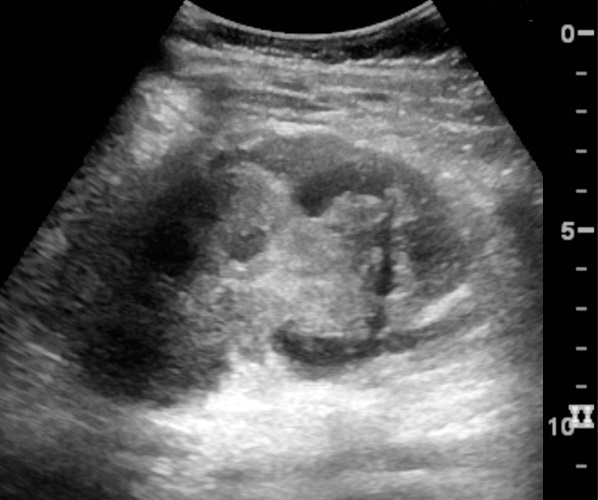
Renal ultrasonograph in renal trauma with laceration of the lower pole and subcapsular fluid collection below the kidney

=== Classification ===
Acute kidney injury is diagnosed based on clinical history and laboratory data. A diagnosis is made when a rapid reduction in kidney function occurs, as measured by serum creatinine, or based on a rapid reduction in urine output, termed oliguria (less than 0.5 mL/kg/h for at least 6 hours).

Classic laboratory findings in AKI
Type	U_{Osm}	U_{Na}	Fe_{Na}	BUN/Cr
Prerenal	>500	<10	<1%	>20
Intrinsic	<350	>20	>2%	<10-15
Postrenal	<350	>40	>4%	>20

AKI can be caused by systemic disease, e.g., autoimmune conditions, such as lupus nephritis), as well as other conditions, such as crush injury, contrast agents, some antibiotics, and more. AKI is often due to multiple factors. AKI occurs in up to 30% of patients following cardiac surgery. Mortality increases by 60-80% in postcardiopulmonary bypass patients who go on to require renal replacement therapy. Preoperative creatinine levels greater than 1.2 mg/dL, combined valve and bypass procedures, emergency surgery, and preoperative intra-aortic balloon pump are risk factors most strongly correlated with postcardiopulmonary bypass acute kidney injury. Other well-known minor risk factors include female gender, congestive heart failure, chronic obstructive pulmonary disease, insulin-requiring diabetes, and depressed left ventricular ejection fraction. Volatile anesthetic agents have been shown to increase renal sympathetic nerve activity, which causes retention of salts and water, diminished renal blood flow, and an increase in serum renin levels, but not in antidiuretic hormone .

Postoperative acute kidney injury is defined as an AKI based on the KDIGO criteria occurring within 7 days of an operative intervention.

Pediatric AKI is defined using the KDIGO definition and the modified neonatal KDIGO criteria for neonates.

== Treatment ==
The management of AKI hinges on identifying the underlying cause and treating it. The main objectives of initial management are to prevent cardiovascular collapse and death and to call for specialist advice from a nephrologist. In addition to treatment of the underlying disorder, management of AKI routinely includes the avoidance of substances that are toxic to the kidneys, called nephrotoxins. These include NSAIDs such as ibuprofen or naproxen, iodinated contrasts such as those used for CT scans, many antibiotics such as gentamicin, and a range of other substances.

Monitoring of kidney function, using serial serum creatinine measurements and monitoring of urine output, is routinely performed. In the hospital, insertion of a urinary catheter helps monitor urine output and relieve possible bladder outlet obstruction, such as with an enlarged prostate.

=== Prerenal ===
In prerenal AKI without fluid overload, administration of intravenous fluids is typically the first step to improving kidney function. Volume status may be monitored with the use of a central venous catheter to avoid over- or under-replacement of fluid.

If low blood pressure persists despite providing a person with adequate amounts of intravenous fluid, medications that increase blood pressure (vasopressors) such as norepinephrine, and in certain circumstances medications that improve the heart's ability to pump (known as inotropes), such as dobutamine, may be given to improve blood flow to the kidney. While a useful vasopressor, no evidence suggests that dopamine is of any specific benefit and may in fact be harmful.

=== Intrinsic ===
The myriad causes of intrinsic AKI require specific therapies. For example, intrinsic AKI due to vasculitis or glomerulonephritis may respond to steroid medication, cyclophosphamide, and (in some cases) plasma exchange. Toxin-induced prerenal AKI often responds to discontinuation of the offending agent, such as ACE inhibitors, ARB antagonists, aminoglycosides, penicillins, NSAIDs, or paracetamol.

The use of diuretics such as furosemide is widespread and sometimes convenient in improving fluid overload. It is not associated with higher mortality (risk of death), nor with any reduced mortality or length of intensive care unit or hospital stay.

=== Postrenal ===
If the cause is obstruction of the urinary tract, relief of the obstruction (with a nephrostomy or urinary catheter) may be necessary.

=== Renal replacement therapy ===
Renal replacement therapy (RRT), such as with hemodialysis, may be instituted in some cases of AKI. RRT can be applied intermittently or continuously. Study results regarding differences in outcomes between intermittent RRT and continuous RRT are inconsistent. A systematic review of the literature in 2008 demonstrated no difference in outcomes between the use of intermittent hemodialysis and continuous venovenous hemofiltration (CVVH, a type of continuous hemodialysis). Among critically ill patients, intensive renal replacement therapy with CVVH does not appear to improve outcomes compared to less intensive intermittent hemodialysis. However, other clinical and health economic studies demonstrated that, initiation of continuous RRT is associated with a lower likelihood of chronic dialysis and was cost-effective compared with intermittent RRT in patients with acute kidney injury.

=== Complications ===
Metabolic acidosis, hyperkalemia, and pulmonary edema may require medical treatment with sodium bicarbonate, antihyperkalemic measures, and diuretics.

Lack of improvement with fluid resuscitation, therapy-resistant hyperkalemia, metabolic acidosis, or fluid overload may necessitate artificial support in the form of dialysis or hemofiltration. However, oliguria during anesthesia may predict AKI, but the effect of a fluid load is highly variable. Striving toward a predefined urine output target to prevent AKI is futile.

=== Early recovery of AKI ===
AKI recovery can be classified into three stages, 1–3, based on the inverse of the AKI KDIGO serum creatinine criteria.

== Prognosis ==
=== Mortality ===
Mortality after AKI remains high; it has a death rate as high as 20%, which may reach up to 50% in the intensive care unit. Each year, around two million people die of AKI worldwide.

AKI develops in 5 to 30% of patients who undergo cardiothoracic surgery, depending on the definition used for AKI. If AKI develops after major abdominal surgery (13.4% of all people who have undergone such surgery), the risk of death is markedly increased (over 12-fold).

=== Kidney function ===
Depending on the cause, a proportion of patients (5–10%) will never regain full kidney function, thus entering end-stage kidney failure and requiring lifelong dialysis or a kidney transplant. Patients with AKI are more likely to die prematurely after being discharged from the hospital, even if their kidney function has recovered.

The risk of developing chronic kidney disease is increased (8.8-fold).

== Epidemiology ==
New cases of AKI are unusual but not rare, affecting about 0.1% of the UK population per year (2000 ppm/year), 20 times the incidence of new end-stage kidney disease (ESKD). AKI requiring dialysis (10% of these) is rare (200 ppm/year), double the incidence of new ESKD.

Hot weather can increase the risk of AKI. For example, the incidence of AKI in agricultural workers increases because of occupational hazards such as dehydration and heat illness. No other traditional risk factors, including age, BMI, diabetes, or hypertension, were associated with incident AKI.

AKI is common among hospitalized patients. It affects some 3–7% of patients admitted to the hospital and around 25–30% of patients in the intensive care unit.

AKI was one of the most expensive conditions seen in U.S. hospitals in 2011, with an aggregated cost of nearly $4.7 billion for roughly 498,000 hospital stays. This was a 346% increase in hospitalizations from 1997, which had 98,000 AKI stays. According to a review article, an increase in cases of acute kidney injury in the last 20 years cannot be explained solely by changes to the manner of reporting.

Clinical investigations have revealed a higher incidence of AKI and associated mortality in males compared to premenopausal women.

== History ==
Before the advancement of modern medicine, AKI was referred to as "uremic poisoning", while uremia was contamination of the blood with urine. Starting around 1847, uremia came to be used for reduced urine output, a condition now called oliguria, which was thought to be caused by the urine's mixing with the blood instead of being voided through the urethra.

AKI due to acute tubular necrosis was recognized in the 1940s in the UK, where crush injury victims during the London Blitz developed patchy necrosis of kidney tubules, leading to a sudden decrease in kidney function. During the Korean and Vietnam wars, the incidence of AKI decreased due to better acute management and administration of intravenous fluids.

== See also ==
- Chronic kidney disease
- Dialysis
- Genitourinary tract injury
- Kidney failure
- Contrast-induced nephropathy
- Ischemia-reperfusion injury of the appendicular musculoskeletal system
- Kidney ischemia
