= Transient hepatic attenuation differences =

Physiological phenomenon impacting the human liver

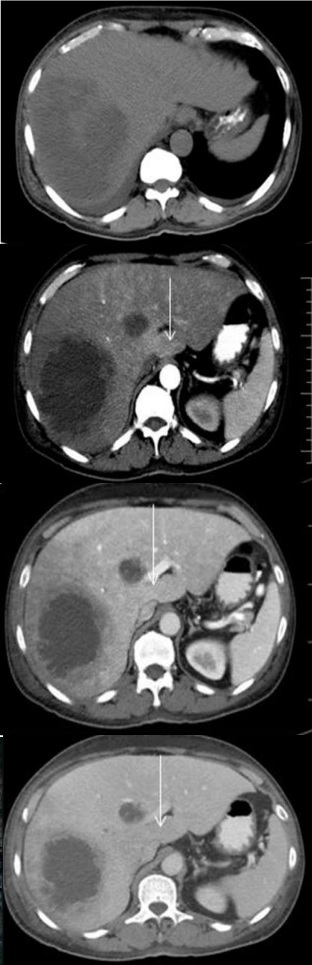
An abscess and a THAD (white arrow) on a contrast CT in native, arterial, portal and delayed phase.

Transient hepatic attenuation differences (THAD) are areas of enhancement during the arterial phase of contrast CT of the liver. THAD is thought to be a physiological phenomenon resulting from regional variation in the blood supply by the portal vein and/or the hepatic artery. THAD may in some cases be associated with liver tumors such as a hepatocellular carcinoma.
