= Genitourinary system =

Organ system of the genitals and the urinary tract

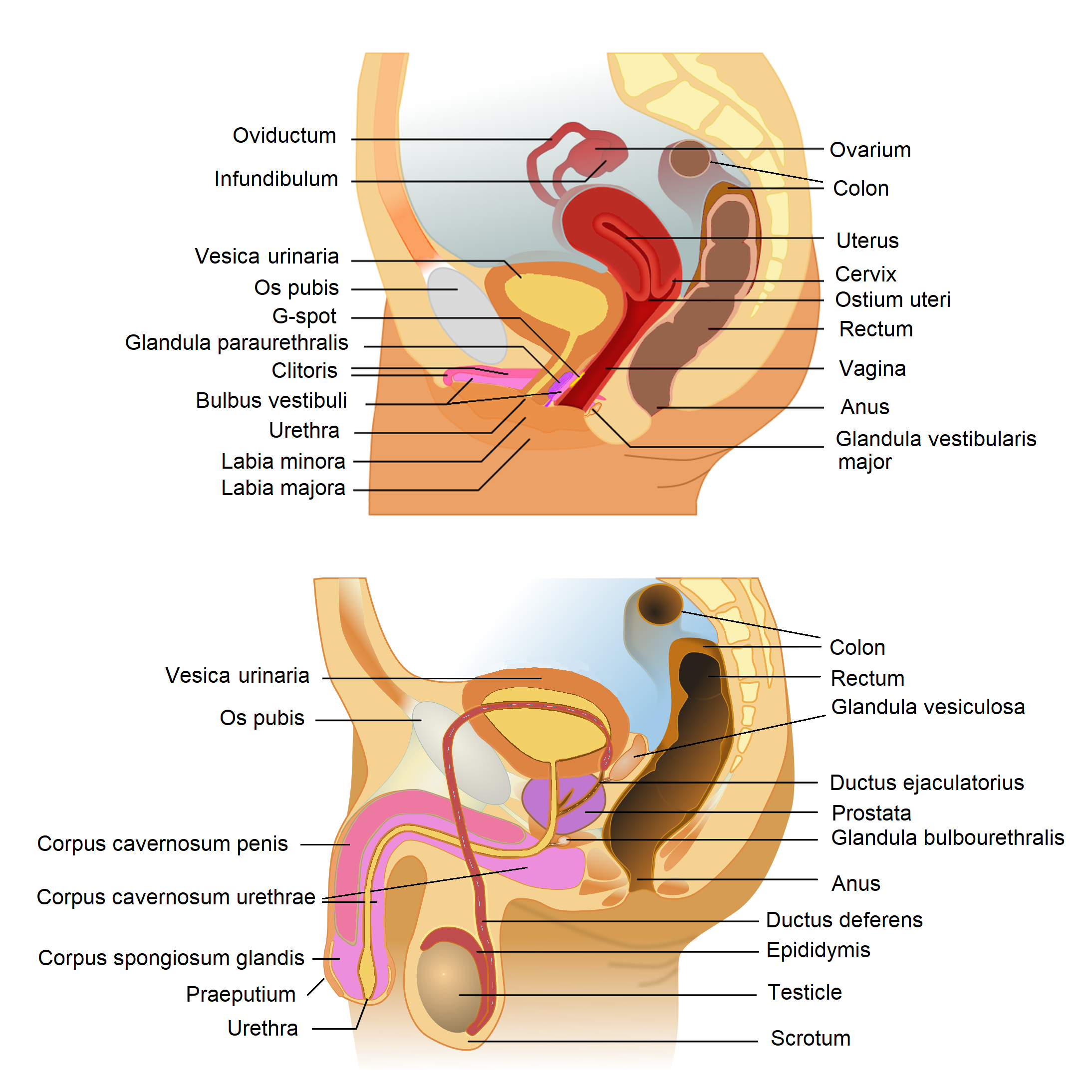
- Some components of the female and male genitourinary system

Details

Identifiers
- Latin: apparatus urogenitalis, systema urogenitale
- MeSH: D014566

The genitourinary system, or urogenital system, consists of the reproductive system and urinary system. These are grouped together in placental mammals because of their proximity to each other, their common embryological origin and the use of common pathways. Because of this, the systems are sometimes imaged together.

The term "apparatus urogenitalis" was used in Nomina Anatomica (under splanchnologia) but is not used in the current Terminologia Anatomica.

== Development ==
The urinary and reproductive organs are developed from the intermediate mesoderm. The permanent organs of the adult are preceded by a set of structures that are purely embryonic and that, with the exception of the ducts, disappear almost entirely before the end of fetal life. These embryonic structures are on either side: the pronephros, the mesonephros and the metanephros of the kidney, and the Wolffian and Müllerian ducts of the sex organ. The pronephros disappears very early; the structural elements of the mesonephros mostly degenerate, but the gonad is developed in their place, with which the Wolffian duct remains as the duct in males, and the Müllerian as that of the female. Some of the tubules of the mesonephros form part of the permanent kidney.

== Structures ==
=== Urethra ===
==== Female Urethra ====
The urethra of an adult human female is 3–4 cm (1.2–1.6 in) long. The female urethra is located between the bladder neck to the external urethral orifice and is behind the symphysis pubis. The urethral wall is composed of an inner epithelial lining, a sub-mucosa layer containing vascular supply, a thin fascial layer, and two layers of smooth muscle.

==== Male Urethra ====
The urethra of an adult human male is 18–20 cm (7.1–7.9 in) long. It has a diameter of 8–9 mm (0.31–0.35 in). The male urethra is divided into two sections.

== Disorders ==
Deaths due to genitourinary diseases per million persons in 2012 22–87 88–106 107–123 124–137 138–148 149–164 165–177 178–214 215–255 256–382

Disorders of the genitourinary system includes a range of disorders from those that are asymptomatic to those that manifest an array of signs and symptoms. Causes for these disorders include congenital anomalies, infectious diseases, trauma, or conditions that secondarily involve the urinary structure.

To gain access to the body, pathogens can penetrate mucous membranes lining the genitourinary tract.

=== Malformations ===
Urogenital malformations include:

- Hypospadias
- Epispadias
- Labial fusion
- Varicocele

As a medical specialty, genitourinary pathology is the subspecialty of surgical pathology which deals with the diagnosis and characterization of neoplastic and non-neoplastic diseases of the urinary tract, male genital tract and testes. However, medical disorders of the kidneys are generally within the expertise of renal pathologists. Genitourinary pathologists generally work closely with urologic surgeons.
