= Contrast-associated acute kidney injury =

- Other names: Contrast-induced nephropathy
- Specialty: Nephrology, radiology

Contrast-associated acute kidney injury (CA-AKI) is a purported form of acute kidney injury in which there has been recent exposure to medical imaging contrast material without another clear cause for the acute kidney injury.

Despite extensive speculation, the actual occurrence of contrast-induced akute kidney injury has not been demonstrated in the literature. Analysis of observational studies has shown that radiocontrast use in CT scanning is not causally related to changes in kidney function. Controlled trials have not shown increased morbidity or mortality in people with contrast-induced acute kidney injury (CI-AKI).

== Terminology ==
Given the increasing doubts about the contribution of radiocontrast to acute kidney injury, in 2020 the American College of Radiology together with the National Kidney Foundation proposed the name contrast-associated acute kidney injury (CA-AKI; formerly referred to as post-contrast acute kidney injury, PC-AKI) because it does not imply a causal role, with the name contrast-induced acute kidney injury (CI-AKI; formerly referred to as contrast-induced nephropathy, CIN) reserved for the rare cases where radiocontrast is likely to be causally related.

== Risk factors ==
Proposed risk factors include eGFR less than 30 mL/min/1.73m^{2} and large intra-arterial doses of contrast medium. It is uncertain whether renal impairment, including having an eGFR less than 30, is associated with any increased risk.

== Prevention ==
Preventive options for people with risk factors include:

- Intravenous saline or intravenous bicarbonate before and after contrast medium. No other medication has shown consistent efficacy in trials, including acetylcysteine (NAC).
- Use lowest dose of contrast necessary for the diagnostic imaging. Consider alternative imaging modality. Avoiding a proper diagnostic modality, such as contrast-enhanced CT scan, for clinically important indications, carries its own risk.

== Diagnosis ==
CA-AKI is defined as a serum creatinine increase of at least 50% or ≥0.3 mg/dl (>26.4 μmol/L) within 48 hours after contrast medium exposure.

== Mechanism ==
Fluctuation in renal function and serum creatinine is natural and may wrongly be attributed to contrast media use. The fluctuation is more pronounced in people with renal impairment.

Proposed mechanisms of CI-AKI include a combination of direct renal tubule damage from the contrast agent and reductions in blood flow to areas of the kidney. The contrast agent directly damages renal tubule cells by a variety of mechanisms, one proposed mechanism is by causing changes in cell polarity. The sodium potassium pump (also known as the Na+/K+ ATPase) is redistributed from the basal surface to the luminal surface of renal tubule cells. This causes sodium to be transported into the lumen, where it is delivered to the distal renal tubule. This sodium load being delivered to the distal renal tubule leads to renal vasoconstriction via tubuloglomerular feedback, with the vasoconstriction and restriction of blood flow leading to injury of tubular cells. Contrast agents cause damage to renal tubular cells in other ways specific to the type of contrast agent, leading to apoptosis and necrosis of the tubular cells. The damaged renal tubular cells detach from the basement membrane and accumulate in the tubules, which causes an increase in tubular pressure, reduced glomerular filtration rate, and luminal blockage. The viscosity of contrast filtered into the tubule may also contribute to increases in tubular pressure. Contrast agents may also cause renal tubular injury by causing renal vasoconstriction mediated by inhibition of vasodilators such as nitric oxide and prostaglandins and activation of endothelin. This renal vasoconstriction, along with increases in blood viscosity caused by the contrast agents themselves, leads to renal vasoconstriction and reduced blood flow to metabolically active areas of the kidneys, thus causing kidney damage. Changes in blood osmolality due to the contrast agents may lead to reduced red blood cell elasticity, thus leading to microthrombi development in the small blood vessels of the kidney, further reducing glomerular blood flow.

== Prognosis ==
CA-AKI, and presumably CI-AKI, often returns to baseline renal function within 7 to 10 days. Permanent decline is rare. In a 2012 meta-analysis, the decline in renal function was shown to persist in 1.1% of the patients.

== Clinical relevance ==
Doubts regarding the significance of the phenomenon appeared in the scientific literature in 2013. Several studies have shown that intravenous contrast material administration was not associated with excess risk of acute kidney injury, dialysis, or death, even among patients with comorbidities reported to predispose them to nephrotoxicity. Moreover, hydration, the most established prevention measure to prevent CI-AKI was shown to be ineffective in the POSEIDON trial, raising further doubts regarding the significance of this disease state. Meta-analyses have shown no causal relationship between the use of contrast media and AKI.
