= Urine sodium =

Urine sodium is a measurement of the concentration of sodium in the urine.

It is a test ordered to distinguish between forms of renal failure and to classify the severity of hyponatremia.

The urine sodium is expressed as a concentration (such as millimoles per liter). The result must therefore be interpreted in the context of the degree of urine concentration present. Alternatively, the urine sodium can be standardized to the excretion of creatinine using a formula such as the fractional excretion of sodium (FENa).

Parameter	Value
renal blood flow	RBF = 1000 mL/min
hematocrit	HCT = 40%
glomerular filtration rate	GFR = 120 mL/min
renal plasma flow	RPF = 600 mL/min
filtration fraction	FF = 20%
urine flow rate	V = 1 mL/min

Sodium	Inulin	Creatinine	PAH
S_{Na} = 150 mEq/L	S_{In} = 1 mg/mL	S_{Cr} = 0.01 mg/mL	S_{PAH} =
U_{Na} = 710 mEq/L	U_{In} = 150 mg/mL	U_{Cr} = 1.25 mg/mL	U_{PAH} =
C_{Na} = 5 mL/min	C_{In} = 150 mL/min	C_{Cr} = 125 mL/min	C_{PAH} = 420 mL/min
			ER = 90%
			ERPF = 540 mL/min

Because the hypothalamus/osmoreceptor system ordinarily works well to cause drinking or urination to restore the body's sodium concentrations to normal, this system can be used in medical treatment to regulate the body's total fluid content, by first controlling the body's sodium content. Thus, when a powerful diuretic drug is given which causes the kidneys to excrete sodium, the effect is accompanied by an excretion of body water (water loss accompanies sodium loss). This happens because the kidney is unable to efficiently retain water while excreting large amounts of sodium. In addition, after sodium excretion, the osmoreceptor system may sense lowered sodium concentration in the blood and then direct compensatory urinary water loss in order to correct the hyponatremic (low blood sodium) state.

Classifying renal disease

When classifying renal disease, urine sodium levels can provide insight into the underlying cause. A low urine sodium (<20 mEq/L) indicates an acute kidney injury (AKI), while sodium concentrations present high (>40 mEq/L) in acute tubular necrosis.
