= Extraction ratio =

Measure in renal physiology

Parameter	Value
renal blood flow	RBF = 1000 mL/min
hematocrit	HCT = 40%
glomerular filtration rate	GFR = 120 mL/min
renal plasma flow	RPF = 600 mL/min
filtration fraction	FF = 20%
urine flow rate	V = 1 mL/min

Sodium	Inulin	Creatinine	PAH
S_{Na} = 150 mEq/L	S_{In} = 1 mg/mL	S_{Cr} = 0.01 mg/mL	S_{PAH} =
U_{Na} = 710 mEq/L	U_{In} = 150 mg/mL	U_{Cr} = 1.25 mg/mL	U_{PAH} =
C_{Na} = 5 mL/min	C_{In} = 150 mL/min	C_{Cr} = 125 mL/min	C_{PAH} = 420 mL/min
			ER = 90%
			ERPF = 540 mL/min

Extraction ratio is a measure in renal physiology, primarily used to calculate renal plasma flow in order to evaluate renal function. It measures the percentage of the compound entering the kidney that was excreted into the final urine.

Measured in concentration in blood plasma, it may thus be expressed as:

$$Extraction \ ratio = \frac{P_a - P_v}{P_a}$$

, where P_{a} is the concentration in renal artery, and P_{v} is the concentration in the renal vein.

For instance, para aminohippuric acid (PAH) is almost completely excreted in the final urine, and thus almost none is found in the venous return (P_{v} ~0). Therefore, the extraction ratio of PAH ~1. This is why PAH is used in PAH clearance to estimate renal plasma flow.

== Hepatic extraction ratio ==
The "Hepatic Extraction Ratio" is a similar measurement for clearance of a substance (usually a pharmacological drug) by the liver. It is defined as the fraction of drug removed from blood by the liver, and depends on 3 factors— the hepatic blood flow, the uptake into the hepatocytes, and the enzyme metabolic capacity. Examples of drugs with a high hepatic extraction ratio include propranolol, opiates, and lignocaine.
