= PAH clearance =

Parameter	Value
renal blood flow	RBF = 1000 mL/min
hematocrit	HCT = 40%
glomerular filtration rate	GFR = 120 mL/min
renal plasma flow	RPF = 600 mL/min
filtration fraction	FF = 20%
urine flow rate	V = 1 mL/min
Sodium	Inulin	Creatinine	PAH
S_{Na} = 150 mEq/L	S_{In} = 1 mg/mL	S_{Cr} = 0.01 mg/mL	S_{PAH} =
U_{Na} = 710 mEq/L	U_{In} = 150 mg/mL	U_{Cr} = 1.25 mg/mL	U_{PAH} =
C_{Na} = 5 mL/min	C_{In} = 150 mL/min	C_{Cr} = 125 mL/min	C_{PAH} = 420 mL/min
			ER = 90%
			ERPF = 540 mL/min
- Purpose: measure renal plasma flow

Para-aminohippurate (PAH) clearance is a method used in renal physiology to measure renal plasma flow, which is a measure of renal function.

PAH is completely removed from blood that passes through the kidneys (PAH undergoes both glomerular filtration and tubular secretion), and therefore the rate at which the kidneys can clear PAH from the blood reflects total renal plasma flow.

The concentration of PAH is measured in one arterial blood sample (P_{PAH}) and one urine sample(U_{PAH}). The urine flow (V) is also measured. Renal perfusion flow is then calculated by:

$$RPF = \frac{U_{PAH}}{P_{PAH}} V$$

What is calculated is the effective renal plasma flow (eRPF). However, since the renal extraction ratio of PAH almost equals 1, then eRPF almost equals RPF.

== Precision ==
The renal extraction ratio of PAH in a normal individual is approximately 0.92, and thus not exactly 1.0. Thus, this method usually underestimates RPF by approximately 10%. This margin of error is generally acceptable considering the ease with which eRPF is measured.

== See also ==
- Renal blood flow
