= Filtration fraction =

Parameter	Value
renal blood flow	RBF = 1000 mL/min
hematocrit	HCT = 40%
glomerular filtration rate	GFR = 120 mL/min
renal plasma flow	RPF = 600 mL/min
filtration fraction	FF = 20%
urine flow rate	V = 1 mL/min

Sodium	Inulin	Creatinine	PAH
S_{Na} = 150 mEq/L	S_{In} = 1 mg/mL	S_{Cr} = 0.01 mg/mL	S_{PAH} =
U_{Na} = 710 mEq/L	U_{In} = 150 mg/mL	U_{Cr} = 1.25 mg/mL	U_{PAH} =
C_{Na} = 5 mL/min	C_{In} = 150 mL/min	C_{Cr} = 125 mL/min	C_{PAH} = 420 mL/min
			ER = 90%
			ERPF = 540 mL/min

In renal physiology, the filtration fraction is the ratio of the glomerular filtration rate (GFR) over the renal plasma flow (RPF).

The filtration fraction equation is:

$FF = \frac{GFR}{RPF}$.

The filtration fraction, therefore, represents the proportion of the fluid reaching the kidneys that passes into the renal tubules. It is normally about 20%.

GFR on its own is the most common and important measure of renal function. However, in conditions such as renal artery stenosis, blood flow to the kidneys is reduced. Filtration fraction must therefore be increased in order to perform the normal functions of the kidney. Loop diuretics and thiazide diuretics decrease filtration fraction.

Catecholamines (norepinephrine and epinephrine) increase filtration fraction by vasoconstriction of afferent and efferent arterioles, possibly through activation of alpha-1 adrenergic receptors.

Severe hemorrhage will also result in an increased filtration fraction.
