= Effective renal plasma flow =

Measure of kidney function

Parameter	Value
renal blood flow	RBF = 1000 mL/min
hematocrit	HCT = 40%
glomerular filtration rate	GFR = 120 mL/min
renal plasma flow	RPF = 600 mL/min
filtration fraction	FF = 20%
urine flow rate	V = 1 mL/min

Sodium	Inulin	Creatinine	PAH
S_{Na} = 150 mEq/L	S_{In} = 1 mg/mL	S_{Cr} = 0.01 mg/mL	S_{PAH} =
U_{Na} = 710 mEq/L	U_{In} = 150 mg/mL	U_{Cr} = 1.25 mg/mL	U_{PAH} =
C_{Na} = 5 mL/min	C_{In} = 150 mL/min	C_{Cr} = 125 mL/min	C_{PAH} = 420 mL/min
			ER = 90%
			ERPF = 540 mL/min

Effective renal plasma flow (eRPF) is a measure used in renal physiology to calculate renal plasma flow (RPF) and hence estimate renal function.

Because the extraction ratio of PAH is high, it has become commonplace to estimate the RPF by dividing the amount of PAH in the urine by the plasma PAH level, ignoring the level in renal venous blood. The value obtained in this way is called the effective renal plasma flow (eRPF) to indicate that the level in renal venous plasma was not measured.

The actual RPF can be calculated from eRPF as follows:

$$\text{Actual RPF} = \frac{\text{eRPF}}{\text{Extraction ratio}}$$

where extraction ratio is the ratio of compound entering the kidney that is excreted into the final urine.

When using a compound with an extraction ratio near 1, such as para-aminohippurate (PAH), eRPF approximates RPF. Therefore, PAH clearance can be used to estimate RPF.
