= Radioisotope renography =

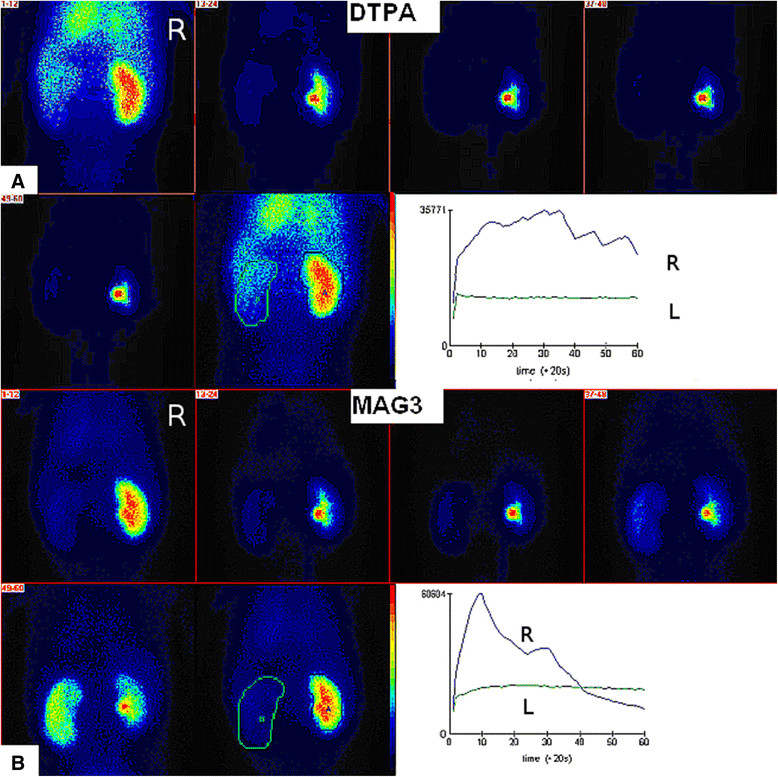
- Renal imaging using ^{99m}Tc DTPA and ^{99m}MAG3 with renographic curves
- ICD-9-CM: 92.03
- MeSH: D011866
- OPS-301 code: 3-706

Radioisotope renography is a form of medical imaging of the kidneys that uses radiolabelling. A renogram, which may also be known as a MAG3 scan, allows a nuclear medicine physician or a radiologist to visualize the kidneys and learn more about how they are functioning. MAG3 is an acronym for mercapto acetyl tri glycine, a compound that is chelated with a radioactive element – technetium-99m.

The two most common radiolabelled pharmaceutical agents used are ^{99m}Tc-MAG3 (MAG3 is also called "mercaptoacetyltriglycine" or "mertiatide") and ^{99m}Tc DTPA (diethylenetriaminepentacetate). Some other radiolabelled pharmaceuticals are EC (Ethylenedicysteine) and 131-iodine labelled OIH (ortho-iodohippurate).

== Scan procedure ==
After injection into the veins, the compound is excreted by the kidneys, and its progress through the renal system can be tracked with a gamma camera. A series of images are taken at regular intervals. Processing then involves drawing a region of interest (ROI) around both kidneys, and a computer program produces a graph of radioactivity inside the kidney with time, representing the quantity of tracer, from the number of counts measured inside in each image (representing a different time point).

If the kidney is not getting blood for example, it will not be viewed at all, even if it looks structurally normal in medical ultrasonography or magnetic resonance imaging. If the kidney is getting blood, but there is an obstruction inferior to the kidney in the bladder or ureters, the radioisotope will not pass beyond the level of the obstruction, whereas if there is a partial obstruction then there is a delayed transit time for the MAG3 to pass. More information can be gathered by calculating time activity curves; with normal kidney perfusion, peak activity should be observed after 3–5 minutes. The relative quantitative information gives the differential function between each kidney's filtration activity.

== Tracers ==
Technetium-99m MAG3

MAG3 is preferred over ^{99m}Tc DTPA in neonates, patients with impaired function, and patients with suspected obstruction, due to its more efficient extraction. The MAG3 clearance is highly correlated with the effective renal plasma flow (ERPF), and the MAG3 clearance can be used as an independent measure of kidney function. After intravenous administration, about 40-50% of the MAG3 in the blood is extracted by the proximal tubules with each pass through the kidneys; the proximal tubules then secrete the MAG3 into the tubular lumen.

^{99m}Tc DTPA is filtered by the glomerulus and may be used to measure the glomerular filtration rate (GFR) (in a separate test), making it theoretically the best (most accurate) choice for kidney function imaging. The extraction fraction of DTPA is approximately 20%, less than half that of MAG3. DTPA is the second most commonly used renal radiopharmaceutical in the United States.

== Clinical use ==
The technique is very useful in evaluating the functioning of kidneys. Radioisotopes can differentiate between passive dilatation and obstruction. It is widely used before kidney transplantation to assess the vascularity of the kidney to be transplanted and with a test dose of captopril to highlight possible renal artery stenosis in the donor's other kidney, and later the performance of the transplant. Post-transplantation renography can be used for the diagnosis of vascular and urological complications. Also, early post-transplantation renography is used for the assessment of delayed graft function.

The use of the test to identify reduced kidney function after test doses of captopril (an angiotensin-converting enzyme inhibitor medication) has also been used to identify the cause of hypertension in patients with kidney failure. Initially there was uncertainty as to the usefulness, or best test parameter to identify renal artery stenosis, the eventual consensus was that the distinctive finding is of alteration in the differential function.

== History ==
In 1986, MAG3 was developed at the University of Utah by Dr. Alan R. Fritzberg, Dr. Sudhakar Kasina, and Dr. Dennis Eshima. The drug underwent clinical trials in 1987 and passed Phase III testing in 1988.

Before the development of tracers such as ^{99m}Tc-MAG3, a range of other radiopharmaceuticals were employed. The test was first introduced in 1956, using iodine-131 diodrast. Later developments included iodine-131, and then iodine-123, labelled ortho-Iodohippuric acid (OIH, marketed as Hippuran).

^{99m}Tc-MAG3 has replaced ^{131}I-OIH because of better quality imaging regardless of the level of kidney function, and lower radiation doses.

== See also ==
- Nuclear medicine
- DMSA scan
