= Shrunken pore syndrome =

Type of kidney disorder

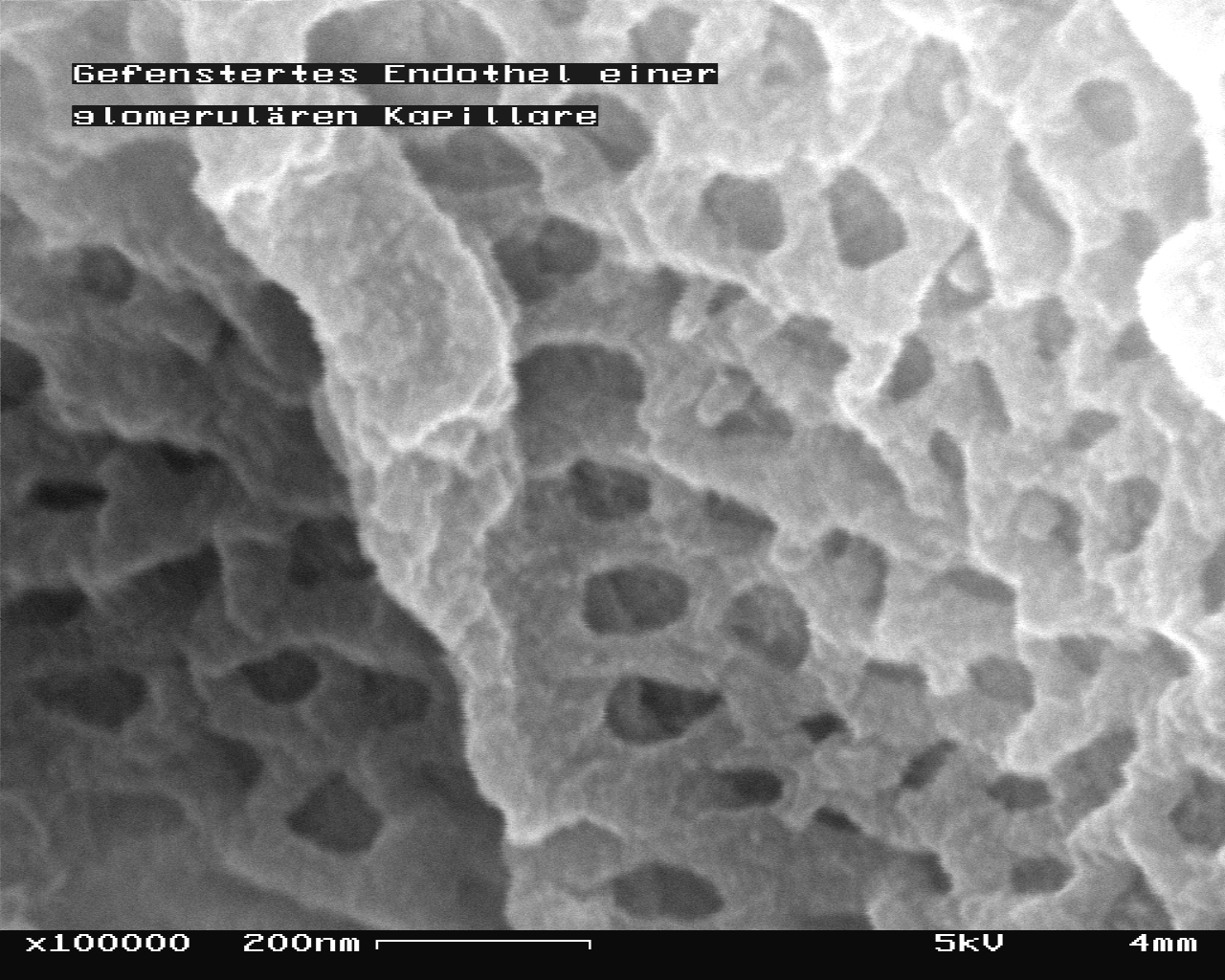
Pores in one of the structures of the glomerular filtration barrier

Shrunken pore syndrome (SPS) is a kidney disorder described in 2015 in which the pores in the glomerular filtration barrier are hypothesized to have shrunken so that the glomerular filtration rate (GFR) of 5–30 kDa proteins, for example cystatin C, is selectively reduced compared to that of small molecules (less than 5 kDa) such as water and creatinine. The syndrome is associated with premature death. SPS has been identified in children.

== Mechanism ==
Glomerulus and Bowman's capsule. The blood filtered through the glomerular filtration barrier corresponds to the primary urine collected in the Bowman's capsule.

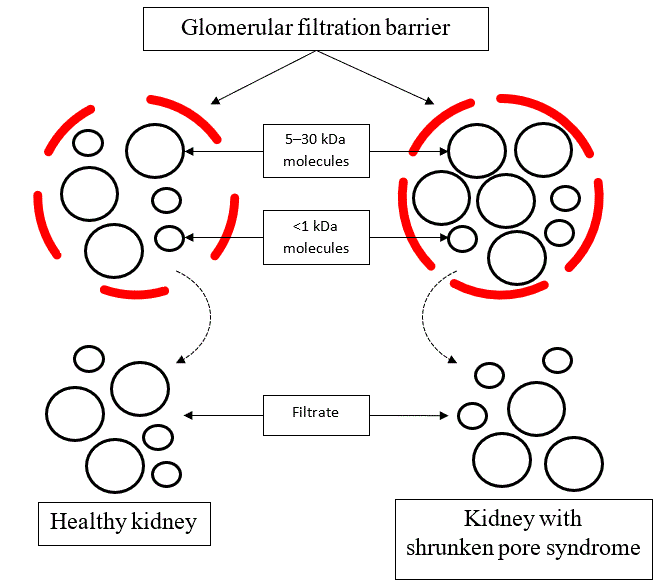
The figure compares the glomerular barrier in kidneys with and without shrunken pore syndrome

It has been speculated that SPS is both caused by, and exacerbates, cardiovascular disease. It was stated in 2014 that the kidneys have a role in maintaining the equilibrium between production and catabolism of most proteins between about 5 and 30 kDa in molecular mass and that failure to do so results in serious disease and strongly increased mortality, when the kidney disorder shrunken pore syndrome was identified. Proteins less than 30 kDa comprise about 36% of the total human proteome. A hypothesis concerning the pathophysiology of SPS is that several 5–30 kDa proteins with signalling functions, for example cytokines, are increased in concentration and promote development of serious disorders like cancer and cardiovascular disorders.

== Diagnosis ==
An eGFR_{cystatin C}/eGFR_{creatinine}-ratio <0.60, or <0.70, in the absence of non-renal influences on eGFR_{cystatin C} or eGFR_{creatinine}, identifies a condition as SPS. Optimal classification and stratification of chronic kidney disease requires not only analysis of GFR (estimated or measured) and albuminuria, but also determination of the eGFR_{cystatin C}/eGFR_{creatinine}-ratio to assess the presence of SPS.

== Prognosis ==
The mortality of SPS is higher than that of cancer, diabetes mellitus, cardiovascular disease or chronic kidney disease.
