= Renal blood flow =

- MeSH: D012079

In renal physiology, renal blood flow (RBF) is the volume of blood delivered to the kidneys per unit time. In humans, the kidneys together receive roughly 20 - 25% of cardiac output, amounting to 1.2 - 1.3 L/min in a healthy adult. It passes about 94% to the cortex. RBF is closely related to renal plasma flow (RPF), which is the volume of blood plasma delivered to the kidneys per unit time.

Parameter	Value
renal blood flow	RBF = 1000 mL/min
hematocrit	HCT = 40%
glomerular filtration rate	GFR = 120 mL/min
renal plasma flow	RPF = 600 mL/min
filtration fraction	FF = 20%
urine flow rate	V = 1 mL/min

Sodium	Inulin	Creatinine	PAH
S_{Na} = 150 mEq/L	S_{In} = 1 mg/mL	S_{Cr} = 0.01 mg/mL	S_{PAH} =
U_{Na} = 710 mEq/L	U_{In} = 150 mg/mL	U_{Cr} = 1.25 mg/mL	U_{PAH} =
C_{Na} = 5 mL/min	C_{In} = 150 mL/min	C_{Cr} = 125 mL/min	C_{PAH} = 420 mL/min
			ER = 90%
			ERPF = 540 mL/min

While the terms generally apply to arterial blood delivered to the kidneys, both RBF and RPF can be used to quantify the volume of venous blood exiting the kidneys per unit time. In this context, the terms are commonly given subscripts to refer to arterial or venous blood or plasma flow, as in RBF_{a}, RBF_{v}, RPF_{a}, and RPF_{v}. Physiologically, however, the differences in these values are negligible so that arterial flow and venous flow are often assumed equal.

== Renal plasma flow ==
Renal plasma flow
- MeSH: D017595

Renal plasma flow is the volume of plasma that reaches the kidneys per unit time. Renal plasma flow is given by the Fick principle:

$$RPF = \frac{U_x V}{P_a - P_v}$$

This is essentially a conservation of mass equation which balances the renal inputs (the renal artery) and the renal outputs (the renal vein and ureter). Put simply, a non-metabolizable solute entering the kidney via the renal artery has two points of exit, the renal vein and the ureter. The mass entering through the artery per unit time must equal the mass exiting through the vein and ureter per unit time:

$$RPF_a \times P_a = RPF_v \times P_v + U_x \times V$$

where P_{a} is the arterial plasma concentration of the substance, P_{v} is its venous plasma concentration, U_{x} is its urine concentration, and V is the urine flow rate. The product of flow and concentration gives mass per unit time.

As mentioned previously, the difference between arterial and venous blood flow is negligible, so RPF_{a} is assumed to be equal to RPF_{v}, thus

$$RPF \times P_a = RPF \times P_v + U_x V$$

Rearranging yields the previous equation for RPF:

$$RPF = \frac{U_x V}{P_a - P_v}$$

== Measuring ==
Values of P_{v} are difficult to obtain in patients. In practice, PAH clearance is used instead to calculate the effective renal plasma flow (eRPF). PAH (para-aminohippurate) is freely filtered, is not reabsorbed, and is secreted within the nephron. In other words, not all PAH crosses into the primary filtrate in Bowman's capsule and the remaining PAH in the vasa recta or peritubular capillaries is taken up and secreted by epithelial cells of the proximal convoluted tubule into the tubule lumen. In this way PAH, at low doses, is almost completely cleared from the blood during a single pass through the kidney. (Accordingly, the plasma concentration of PAH in renal venous blood is approximately zero.) Setting P_{v} to zero in the equation for RPF yields

$$eRPF = \frac{U_x}{P_a} V$$

which is the equation for renal clearance. For PAH, this is commonly represented as

$$eRPF = \frac{U_{PAH}}{P_{PAH}} V$$

Since the venous plasma concentration of PAH is not exactly zero (in fact, it is usually 10% of the PAH arterial plasma concentration), eRPF usually underestimates RPF by approximately 10%. This margin of error is generally acceptable considering the ease with which PAH infusion allows eRPF to be measured.

Finally, renal blood flow (RBF) can be calculated from a patient's renal plasma flow (RPF) and hematocrit (Hct) using the following equation:

$RBF = \frac{RPF}{1-Hct}$.

== Autoregulation and kidney failure ==
If the kidney is methodologically perfused at moderate pressures (90–220 mm Hg performed on an experimental animal; in this case, a dog), then, there is a proportionate increase of:

-Renal Vascular Resistance

Along with the increase in pressure. At low perfusion pressures, Angiotensin II may act by constricting the efferent arterioles, thus mainlining the GFR and playing a role in autoregulation of renal blood flow. People with poor blood flow to the kidneys caused by medications that inhibit angiotensin-converting enzyme may face kidney failure.
