= Cystatin-C =

Protein used as a biomarker of kidney function

CST3
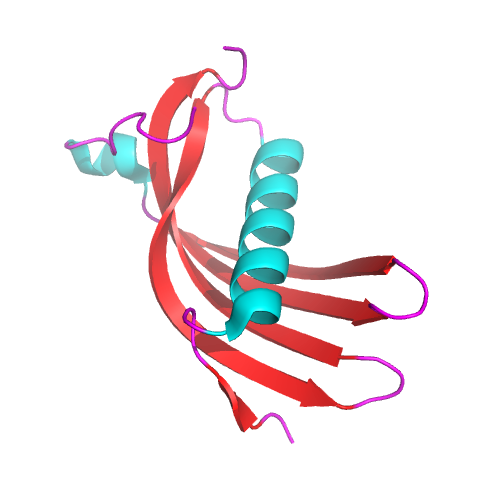

Identifiers
- Aliases: CST3, ARMD11, HEL-S-2, cystatin C
- External IDs: OMIM: 604312; MGI: 102519; GeneCards: CST3
Available structures
| PDB | Ortholog search: PDBe RCSB |
| PDB | List of PDB id codes 1G96, 1R4C, 1TIJ, 3GAX, 3NX0, 3PS8, 3QRD, 3S67, 3SVA |

Gene location (Human)
| Chr. | Chromosome 20 (human) |
| Band | 20p11.21 | Start | 23,626,706 bp |
| Band | 20p11.21 | End | 23,638,473 bp |

Gene location (Mouse)
| Chr. | Chromosome 2 (mouse) |
| Band | 2 G3|2 73.6 cM | Start | 148,713,642 bp |
| Band | 2 G3|2 73.6 cM | End | 148,717,612 bp |
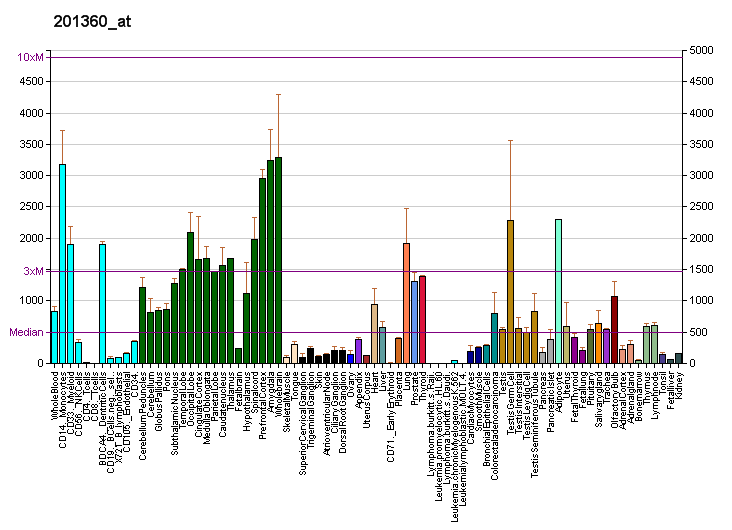
RNA expression pattern
| Bgee | Human / Mouse (ortholog); Top expressed in: right frontal lobe; amygdala; right testis; left testis; nucleus accumbens; retinal pigment epithelium; apex of heart; right coronary artery; right hemisphere of cerebellum; Descending thoracic aorta / Top expressed in: skin of external ear; arcuate nucleus; globus pallidus; entorhinal cortex; median eminence; perirhinal cortex; superior frontal gyrus; CA3 field; retinal pigment epithelium; nucleus accumbens; More reference expression data |
| BioGPS | More reference expression data |
Gene ontology
| Molecular function | peptidase inhibitor activity; cysteine-type endopeptidase inhibitor activity; amyloid-beta binding; protein binding; identical protein binding; endopeptidase inhibitor activity; protease binding |
| Cellular component | extracellular region; extracellular exosome; tertiary granule lumen; ficolin-1-rich granule lumen; basement membrane; extracellular space; cytoplasm; lysosome; multivesicular body; endoplasmic reticulum; endoplasmic reticulum lumen; axon; nuclear membrane; vesicle; cell projection; soma; contractile fiber; perinuclear region of cytoplasm; Golgi apparatus; plasma membrane |
| Biological process | negative regulation of proteolysis; defense response; negative regulation of peptidase activity; negative regulation of extracellular matrix disassembly; regulation of tissue remodeling; negative regulation of blood vessel remodeling; negative regulation of elastin catabolic process; negative regulation of collagen catabolic process; neutrophil degranulation; supramolecular fiber organization; eye development; response to hypoxia; cell activation; apoptotic process; response to oxidative stress; brain development; salivary gland development; embryo implantation; positive regulation of cell population proliferation; male gonad development; response to toxic substance; response to carbohydrate; response to inorganic substance; response to organic cyclic compound; response to nutrient levels; response to estradiol; cellular response to oxidative stress; circadian sleep/wake cycle, REM sleep; regulation of programmed cell death; post-translational protein modification; positive regulation of DNA replication; response to axon injury; Sertoli cell development; negative regulation of cell death; cellular response to hydrogen peroxide; negative regulation of cysteine-type endopeptidase activity; negative regulation of endopeptidase activity |
Sources:Amigo / QuickGO
Orthologs
| Databases | NCBI: entry; OMA: entry |
| Species | Human | Mouse |
| Entrez | 1471 | 13010 |
| Ensembl | ENSG00000101439 | ENSMUSG00000027447 |
| UniProt | P01034 | P21460 |
| RefSeq (mRNA) | NM_001288614; NM_000099 | NM_009976 |
| RefSeq (protein) | NP_000090; NP_001275543 | NP_034106 |
| Location (UCSC) | Chr 20: 23.63 – 23.64 Mb | Chr 2: 148.71 – 148.72 Mb |
| PubMed search |
- Wikidata
| View/Edit Human | View/Edit Mouse |

Cystatin-C or cystatin 3 (formerly gamma trace, post-gamma-globulin, or neuroendocrine basic polypeptide), is a protein that in humans is encoded by the CST3 gene.

In humans most nucleated cells produce cystatin C as a polypeptide of 120 amino acids. It is found in virtually all tissues and body fluids. Functionally, it is a potent inhibitor of lysosomal proteinases and an important extracellular inhibitor of cysteine proteases. Cystatin C belongs to the type 2 cystatin gene family.

In medicine Cystatin C is most commonly known as a biomarker of kidney function. Additionally it has a role in predicting cardiovascular disease, and may play a role in brain disorders involving amyloid such as Alzheimer's disease.

== Role in medicine ==
=== Kidney function assessment ===
Glomerular filtration rate (GFR), a marker of kidney health, is most accurately measured by injecting compounds such as inulin, radioisotopes such as ^{51}chromium-EDTA, ^{125}I-iothalamate, ^{99m}Tc-DTPA or radiocontrast agents such as iohexol, but these techniques are complicated, costly, time-consuming and have potential side-effects. Creatinine is the most widely used biomarker of kidney function. It is inaccurate at detecting mild renal impairment, and levels can vary with muscle mass but not with protein intake. Urea levels might change with protein intake. Formulas such as the Cockcroft and Gault formula and the MDRD formula (see Renal function) try to adjust for these variables.

Cystatin C has a low molecular weight (approximately 13.3 kilodaltons), and it is removed from the bloodstream by glomerular filtration in the kidneys. If kidney function and glomerular filtration rate decline, the blood levels of cystatin C rise. Cross-sectional studies (based on a single point in time) suggest that serum levels of cystatin C are a more precise test of kidney function (as represented by the glomerular filtration rate, GFR) than serum creatinine levels. Longitudinal studies (following cystatin C over time) are sparse, but some show promising results. Although studies are somewhat divergent, most studies find that cystatin C levels are less dependent on age, gender, ethnicity, diet, and muscle mass compared to creatinine, and that cystatin C is equal or superior to the other available biomarkers in a range of different patient populations, including diabetic patients, in chronic kidney disease (CKD), and after kidney transplant. It has been suggested that cystatin C might predict the risk of developing CKD, thereby signaling a state of 'preclinical' kidney dysfunction. Additionally, the age-related rise in serum cystatin C is a powerful predictor of adverse age-related health outcomes, including all-cause mortality, death from cardiovascular disease, multimorbidity, and declining physical and cognitive function. The UK's National Institute for Health and Care Excellence (NICE) guideline for the assessment and management of CKD in adults concluded that using serum cystatin C to estimate GFR is more specific for important disease outcomes than use of serum creatinine, and may reduce overdiagnosis in patients with a borderline diagnosis, reducing unnecessary appointments, patient worries, and the overall burden of CKD in the population.

Studies have also investigated cystatin C as a marker of kidney function in the adjustment of medication dosages.

Cystatin C levels have been reported to be altered in patients with cancer, (even subtle) thyroid dysfunction and glucocorticoid therapy in some but not all situations. Other reports have found that levels are influenced by cigarette smoking and levels of C-reactive protein. However, inflammation does not cause an increase in the production of cystatin C, since elective surgical procedures, producing a strong inflammatory response in patients, do not change the plasma concentration of cystatin C. Levels seem to be increased in HIV infection, which might or might not reflect actual renal dysfunction. The role of cystatin C to monitor GFR during pregnancy remains controversial. Like creatinine, the elimination of cystatin C via routes other than the kidney increases with worsening GFR.

=== Death and cardiovascular disease ===
Kidney dysfunction increases the risk of death and cardiovascular disease. Several studies have found that increased levels of cystatin C are associated with the risk of death, several types of cardiovascular disease (including myocardial infarction, stroke, heart failure, peripheral arterial disease and metabolic syndrome) and healthy aging. Some studies have found cystatin C to be better in this regard than serum creatinine or creatinine-based GFR equations. Because the association of cystatin C with long term outcomes has appeared stronger than what could be expected for GFR, it has been hypothesized that cystatin C might also be linked to mortality in a way independent of kidney function. In keeping with its housekeeping gene properties, it has been suggested that cystatin C might be influenced by the basal metabolic rate.

=== Proposed shrunken pore syndrome ===
The glomerular sieving coefficients for 10–30 kDa plasma proteins in the human kidney are relatively high with coefficients between 0.9 and 0.07. These relatively high sieving coefficients, combined with the high production of ultrafiltrate in health, means that proteins less than or equal to 30 kDa in plasma normally are mainly cleared by the kidneys and at least 85% of the clearance of cystatin C occurs in the kidney. If the pores of the glomerular membrane shrink, the filtration of bigger molecules, e.g. cystatin C, will decrease, whereas the filtration of small molecules, like water and creatinine, will be less affected. In this case, cystatin C-based estimates of GFR, eGFR_{cystatin C}, will be lower than creatinine-based estimates eGFR_{creatinine}, so that a hypothesized condition, named shrunken pore syndrome, is identified by a low eGFR_{cystatin C}/eGFR_{creatinine}-ratio. This syndrome is associated with a very strong increase in mortality.

=== Neurologic disorders ===
Mutations in the cystatin 3 gene are responsible for the Icelandic type of hereditary cerebral amyloid angiopathy, a condition predisposing to intracerebral haemorrhage, stroke and dementia. The condition is inherited in a dominant fashion. The monomeric cystatin C forms dimers and oligomers by domain swapping and the structures of both the dimers and oligomers have been determined.

Since cystatin 3 also binds amyloid β and reduces its aggregation and deposition, it is a potential target in Alzheimer's disease. Although not all studies have confirmed this, the overall evidence is in favor of a role for CST3 as a susceptibility gene for Alzheimer's disease. Cystatin C levels have been reported to be higher in subjects with Alzheimer's disease.

The role of cystatin C in multiple sclerosis and other demyelinating diseases (characterized by a loss of the myelin nerve sheath) remains controversial.

=== Other roles ===
Cystatin C levels are decreased in atherosclerotic (so-called 'hardening' of the arteries) and aneurysmal (saccular bulging) lesions of the aorta. Genetic and prognostic studies also suggest a role for cystatin C. Breakdown of parts of the vessel wall in these conditions is thought to result from an imbalance between proteinases (cysteine proteases and matrix metalloproteinases, increased) and their inhibitors (such as cystatin C, decreased).

A few studies have looked at the role of cystatin C or the CST3 gene in age-related macular degeneration. Cystatin C has also been investigated as a prognostic marker in several forms of cancer. Its role in pre-eclampsia remains to be confirmed.

== Laboratory measurement ==
Cystatin C can be measured in a random sample of serum (the fluid in blood from which the red blood cells and clotting factors have been removed) using immunoassays such as nephelometry or particle-enhanced turbidimetry. It is a more expensive test than serum creatinine (around $2 or $3, compared to $0.02 to $0.15), which can be measured with a Jaffe reaction.

Reference values differ in many populations and with sex and age. Across different studies, the mean reference interval (as defined by the 5th and 95th percentile) was between 0.52 and 0.98 mg/L. For women, the average reference interval is 0.52 to 0.90 mg/L with a mean of 0.71 mg/L. For men, the average reference interval is 0.56 to 0.98 mg/L with a mean of 0.77 mg/L. The normal values decrease until the first year of life, remaining relatively stable before they increase again, especially beyond age 50. Creatinine levels increase until puberty and differ according to gender from then on, making their interpretation problematic for pediatric patients.

In a large study from the United States National Health and Nutrition Examination Survey, the reference interval (as defined by the 1st and 99th percentile) was between 0.57 and 1.12 mg/L. This interval was 0.55 - 1.18 for women and 0.60 - 1.11 for men. Non-Hispanic blacks and Mexican Americans had lower normal cystatin C levels. Other studies have found that in patients with an impaired renal function, women have lower and blacks have higher cystatin C levels for the same GFR. For example, the cut-off values of cystatin C for CKD for a 60-year-old white women would be 1.12 mg/L and 1.27 mg/L in a black man (a 13% increase). For serum creatinine values adjusted with the MDRD equation, these values would be 0.95 mg/dL to 1.46 mg/dL (a 54% increase).

Based on a threshold level of 1.09 mg/L (the 99th percentile in a population of 20- to 39-year-olds without hypertension, diabetes, microalbuminuria or macroalbuminuria or higher than stage 3 chronic kidney disease), the prevalence of increased levels of cystatin C in the United States was 9.6% in subjects of normal weight, increasing in overweight and obese individuals. In Americans aged 60 and 80 and older, serum cystatin is increased in 41% and more than 50%.

== Molecular biology ==
The cystatin superfamily encompasses proteins that contain multiple cystatin-like sequences. Some of the members are active cysteine protease inhibitors, while others have lost or perhaps never acquired this inhibitory activity. There are three inhibitory families in the superfamily, including the type 1 cystatins (stefins), type 2 cystatins and the kininogens. The type 2 cystatin proteins are a class of cysteine proteinase inhibitors found in a variety of human fluids and secretions, where they appear to provide protective functions. The cystatin locus on the short arm of chromosome 20 contains the majority of the type 2 cystatin genes and pseudogenes.

The CST3 gene is located in the cystatin locus and comprises 3 exons (coding regions, as opposed to introns, non-coding regions within a gene), spanning 4.3 kilo-base pairs. It encodes the most abundant extracellular inhibitor of cysteine proteases. It is found in high concentrations in biological fluids and is expressed in virtually all organs of the body (CST3 is a housekeeping gene). The highest levels are found in semen, followed by breastmilk, tears and saliva. The hydrophobic leader sequence indicates that the protein is normally secreted. There are three polymorphisms in the promoter region of the gene, resulting in two common variants. Several single nucleotide polymorphisms have been associated with altered cystatin C levels.

Cystatin C is a non-glycosylated, basic protein (isoelectric point at pH 9.3). The crystal structure of cystatin C is characterized by a short alpha helix and a long alpha helix which lies across a large antiparallel, five-stranded beta sheet. Like other type 2 cystatins, it has two disulfide bonds. Around 50% of the molecules carry a hydroxylated proline. Cystatin C forms dimers (molecule pairs) by exchanging subdomains; in the paired state, each half is made up of the long alpha helix and one beta strand of one partner, and four beta strands of the other partner.

== History ==
Cystatin C was first described as 'gamma-trace' in 1961 as a trace protein together with other ones (such as beta-trace) in the cerebrospinal fluid and in the urine of people with kidney failure. Grubb and Löfberg first reported its amino acid sequence. They noticed it was increased in patients with advanced kidney failure. It was first proposed as a measure of glomerular filtration rate by Grubb and coworkers in 1985.

Use of serum creatinine and cystatin C was found very effective in accurately reflecting the GFR in a study reported in the July 5, 2012, issue of the New England Journal of Medicine.
