= Inulosucrase =

Class of enzymes

inulosucrase

Identifiers
- EC no.: 2.4.1.9
- CAS no.: 9030-16-4

Databases
- IntEnz: IntEnz view
- BRENDA: BRENDA entry
- ExPASy: NiceZyme view
- KEGG: KEGG entry
- MetaCyc: metabolic pathway
- PRIAM: profile
- PDB structures: RCSB PDB PDBe PDBsum
- Gene Ontology: AmiGO / QuickGO
Search
- PMC: articles
- PubMed: articles
- NCBI: proteins

In enzymology, an inulosucrase (EC 2.4.1.9) is an enzyme that catalyzes the chemical reaction

sucrose + (2,1-beta-D-fructosyl)_{n} $\rightleftharpoons$ glucose + (2,1-beta-D-fructosyl)_{n+1}

Thus, the two substrates of this enzyme are sucrose and (2,1-beta-D-fructosyl)_{n}, whereas its two products are glucose and (2,1-beta-D-fructosyl)_{n+1}.

This enzyme belongs to the family of glycosyltransferases, specifically the hexosyltransferases. The systematic name of this enzyme class is sucrose:2,1-beta-D-fructan 1-beta-D-fructosyltransferase. This enzyme is also called sucrose 1-fructosyltransferase.
