= DMSA scan =

Radionuclide scan

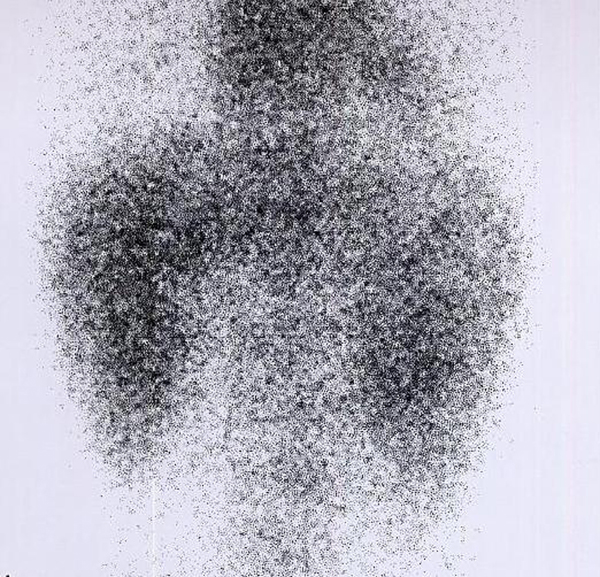
- Decreased Tc^{99m}-DMSA uptake in both kidneys, suggestive of renal failure.
- ICD-10-PCS: CT131ZZ
- MeSH: D019783
- OPS-301 code: 3-706.0
- eMedicine: 2165400
- LOINC: 39854-5

A DMSA scan is a radionuclide scan that uses dimercaptosuccinic acid (DMSA) in assessing renal morphology, structure and function. Radioactive technetium-99m is combined with DMSA and injected into a patient, followed by imaging with a gamma camera after 2-3 hours. A DMSA scan is usually static imaging, while other radiotracers like DTPA and MAG3 are usually used for dynamic imaging to assess renal excretion.

The major clinical indications for this investigation are

1. Detection and/or evaluation of a renal scar, especially in patients having vesicoureteric reflux (VUR)
2. Small or absent kidney (renal agenesis),
3. Ectopic kidneys (sometimes cannot be visualized by ultrasonography of abdomen due to intestinal gas)
4. Evaluation of an occult duplex system,
5. Characterization of certain renal masses,
6. Evaluation of systemic hypertension especially young hypertensive and in cases of suspected vasculitis.
7. It is sometimes used as a test for the diagnosis of acute pyelonephritis. However, the sensitivity of DMSA scan for acute pyelonephritis may be as low as 46%.

Procedure: Patient is injected with 2-5 mCi of Technetium-99m DMSA intravenously and static imaging is done using Gamma camera after 2-3 hours. Imaging time is approximately 5 - 10 minutes depending on the views taken. Usually, posterior and oblique views are a must for better interpretation of the scan. Patient is asked to maintain good hydration before and after the radiotracer injection by drinking water or intravenous fluid administration, if patient cannot drink water for any reason. Usually fasting is not required for scanning purpose and patients can have light breakfast in the morning of the scan day.

The technetium-99m DMSA binds to the proximal convoluted tubules in kidney so the excretion pattern of the kidneys cannot be assessed by this for which renal dynamic scans using radiotracers like DTPA, MAG3 are used.

== See also ==
- Nuclear medicine
