= Ortho-Iodohippuric acid =

Chemical compound

ortho-Iodohippuric acid

Clinical data
- Other names: Iodohippuric acid, I Hippuran, I OIH, I-Hippuran, I-OIH, Iodobenzoylglycine, Sodium iodohippurate, Sodium o-iodohippurate, ortho' Iodohippurate, ortho-Iodohippurate, Orthoiodohippurate, Radio Hippuran, Radio-Hippuran, RadioHippuran, Sodium Iodohippurate
- Routes of administration: intravenous

Pharmacokinetic data
- Excretion: renal

Identifiers
- IUPAC name: 2-[(2-Iodobenzoyl)amino]acetic acid
- CAS Number: 147-58-0
- PubChem CID: 8614
- ChemSpider: 8295
- UNII: 3Y68K91A3M
- CompTox Dashboard (EPA): DTXSID8046161
- ECHA InfoCard: 100.005.176

Chemical and physical data
- Formula: C_{9}H_{8}INO_{3}
- Molar mass: 305.071 g·mol^{−1}
- 3D model (JSmol): Interactive image
- SMILES: C1=CC=C(C(=C1)C(=O)NCC(=O)O)I
- InChI: InChI=1S/C9H8INO3/c10-7-4-2-1-3-6(7)9(14)11-5-8(12)13/h1-4H,5H2,(H,11,14)(H,12,13); Key:CORFWQGVBFFZHF-UHFFFAOYSA-N

ortho-Iodohippuric acid (ortho-iodohippurate, OIH) is an analog of p-aminohippuric acid for the determination of effective renal plasma flow. Labelled OIH has a significantly higher clearance than other radiopharmaceutical yet developed and is eminently suitable for renography. It is eliminated mainly by tubular secretion. In patients with normally functioning kidneys, 85% of the OIH may be found in the urine 30 minutes after intravenous injection.

OIH was first labelled with ^{131}I by Tubis and colleagues (Tubis, Posnick and Nordyke in 1960) and for many years this was the only radiopharmaceutical for renography. ^{131}I has a half-life of 8 days and emits high-energy γ rays (364 keV) in addition to β particles. These physical characteristics were acceptable for probe studies when quantities of the order 1-2 MBq (25-50 μCi) were administered, but they are far from ideal for γ-camera studies which demand a higher activity and a γ ray emission of lower energy. The introduction of OIH labelled with ^{123}I, with its short physical half-life (13 hours) and its gamma emission of 159 keV has greatly improved the diagnostic potential of renal studies by combining the production of high-quality functional images with the ability to derive a renogram. The only factor limiting its widespread use is restricted availability and the expense involved in its cyclotron production.
