= Hereditary cystatin C amyloid angiopathy =

- Other names: Hereditary cerebral hemorrhage with amyloidosis
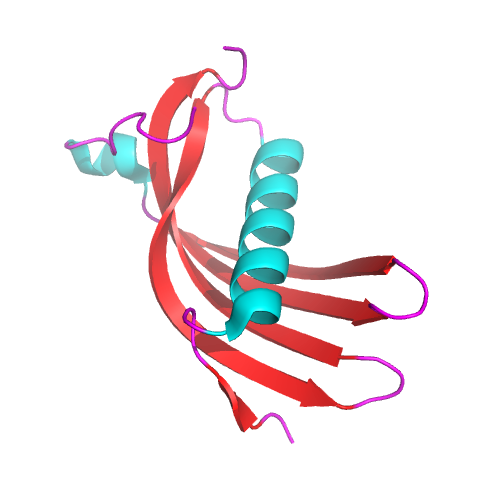
- Cystatin C (or cystatin 3) which is involved in this condition

Hereditary cystatin C amyloid angiopathy (HCCAA) is a rare, fatal type of hereditary cerebral amyloid angiopathy found almost exclusively in Iceland. A mutation in the protein cystatin C leads to amyloid (protein aggregate) dispositions in arteries in the brain, resulting in repeated brain hemorrhages.

The condition is inherited in an autosomal dominant fashion. All known cases have occurred in Iceland — most can be traced to Breiðafjörður in the northwest of Iceland — with the exception of one patient in the US with a sporadic mutation.

Symptoms are related to brain hemorrhage and include dementia and paralysis. They typically appear in the late teens or early twenties, with the average age of death being around 30. As of 2019, around 20 to 30 carriers are thought to be alive.

== Signs and symptoms ==
The most typical initial symptoms are massive sensorimotor hemiparesis, with or without aphasia or neglect symptoms. Exercise appears to be the initial cause of the symptoms, although this is not always the case. While the majority of patients have typical symptoms when they first arrive, atypical presentations, such as those involving primary mental symptoms like progressive dementia or psychiatric symptoms, are uncommon. The few patients who present in their fifth decade or later are more likely to have this atypical presentation, though these cases have been extremely uncommon.
