= Sinistrin =

- Example chemical structure of sinistrin

Names
- Other names: Polyfructosan; Polyfructosan-S; Inulin analogue; Inutest

Identifiers
CAS Number	37311-25-4
ChemSpider	none
DrugBank	DB00638
UNII	Y83V3FE29B

Properties
Chemical formula	(C_{6}H_{10}O_{6})_{n}
Molar mass	Variable
Solubility in water	Good
Solubility in ethanol	Insoluble

Pharmacology
ATC code	V04CH01 (WHO)
- Except where otherwise noted, data are given for materials in their standard state (at 25 °C [77 °F], 100 kPa). verify (what is ?) Infobox references

Sinistrin is a naturally occurring sugar polymer or polysaccharide, also known as polyfructosane. It belongs to the fructan group, like inulin. As it is the case with similar substances, such as fructans or inulin, sinistrin acts as an energy storage molecule in plants.

== Discovery, history, and manufacture ==
In 1879, Schmiedeberg isolated sinistrin from the bulb of the red squill (Urginea maritima). He named the substance ’sinistrin’, from the Latin word 'sinister' for left, according to its optical rotation activities. in 1885, Hammarsten found sinistrin in mucins of Helix pomatia. Today sinistrin is industrially manufactured out of the bulb of red squill by various extraction and purification steps. In 2018, the French pharmacovigilance agency withdrew sinistrin-based products from the market after some patients experienced hypersensitivity reactions including a fatal outcome.

== Biochemistry ==
Sinistrin is an inulin-type β–D-fructan with branches on position 6. It belongs to the group of fructans and is partly counted among the fructooligosaccharides (FOS). Sinistrin is composed out of fructose units (97%) and glucose units (3%, approximately), building a chain of fructose molecules with a terminal glucose unit. The degree of polymerisation (dp) of sinistrin is in average at 15, the molecular weight is at 3500 Da with a range from 2000 to 6000 Da. The main differences between sinistrin and inulin are the higher alkali-resistance and the better water solubility (even in cold water) of sinistrin compared to inulin.

== Uses ==
=== Medical ===
Like inulin, the polymer sinistrin is not metabolized in human blood and passes the kidneys unchanged. Both inulin and sinistrin are therefore frequently used for the diagnosis of kidney disorders. An important measure of kidney function is the glomerular filtration rate (GFR). GFR is the volume of fluid filtered from the renal (kidney) glomerular capillaries into the Bowman's capsule per time unit. To measure this parameter, a marker substance is injected into the blood stream, and its rate of excretion in urine is compared to the plasma concentration. Such a marker substance needs to be non-toxic, not endogenous in the circulation, neither reabsorbed nor secreted in the kidney, and measurable. The measurement of the sinistrin-clearance is used to exactly determine the GFR in humans. The assays to determine sinistrin in urine or plasma are identical to that used for inulin. However, sinistrin is often preferred to the alternative, inulin, because it is highly soluble in water and easier to handle. For the application as a renal diagnostic an aqueous solution of sinistrin is approved under the trade name „Inutest“.
