= Jaffe reaction =

Colorimetric method used in clinical chemistry

Max Jaffe
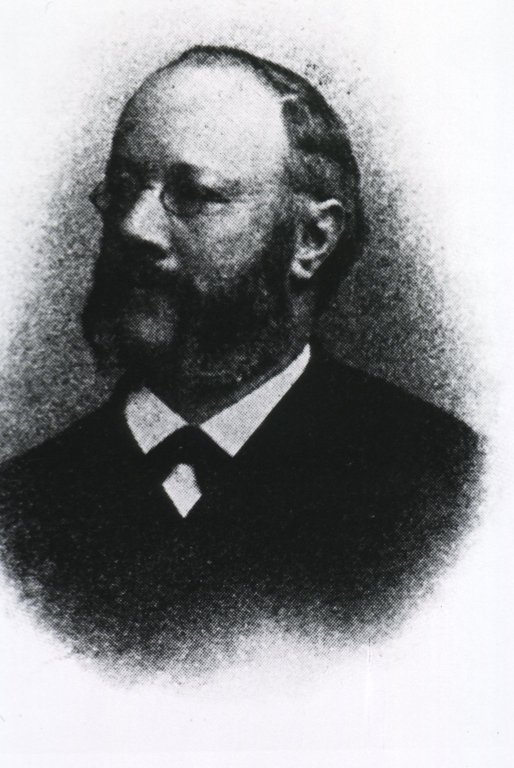
- Born: 25 July 1841; Grünberg in Schlesien, Silesia
- Died: October 26, 1911 (aged 70); Berlin, Germany
- Education: University of Berlin
- Known for: Jaffe reaction of creatinine and picric acid—the oldest clinical methodology still in use.
- Scientific career
- Fields: Biochemistry, Pathology, Pharmacology
- Workplaces: University of Königsberg

The Jaffe reaction is a colorimetric method used in clinical chemistry to determine creatinine levels in blood and urine. In 1886, Max Jaffe (1841–1911) wrote about its basic principles in the paper Über den Niederschlag, welchen Pikrinsäure in normalem Harn erzeugt und über eine neue Reaction des Kreatinins in which he described the properties of creatinine and picric acid in an alkaline solution. The color change that occurred was directly proportional to the concentration of creatinine, however he also noted that several other organic compounds induced similar reactions. In the early 20th century, Otto Folin adapted Jaffe's research into a clinical procedure. The Jaffe reaction, despite its nonspecificity for creatinine, is still widely employed as the method of choice for creatinine testing due to its speed, adaptability in automated analysis, and cost-effectiveness, and is the oldest methodology continued to be used in the medical laboratory. It is this nonspecificity that has motivated the development of new reference methods for creatinine analysis into the 21st century.

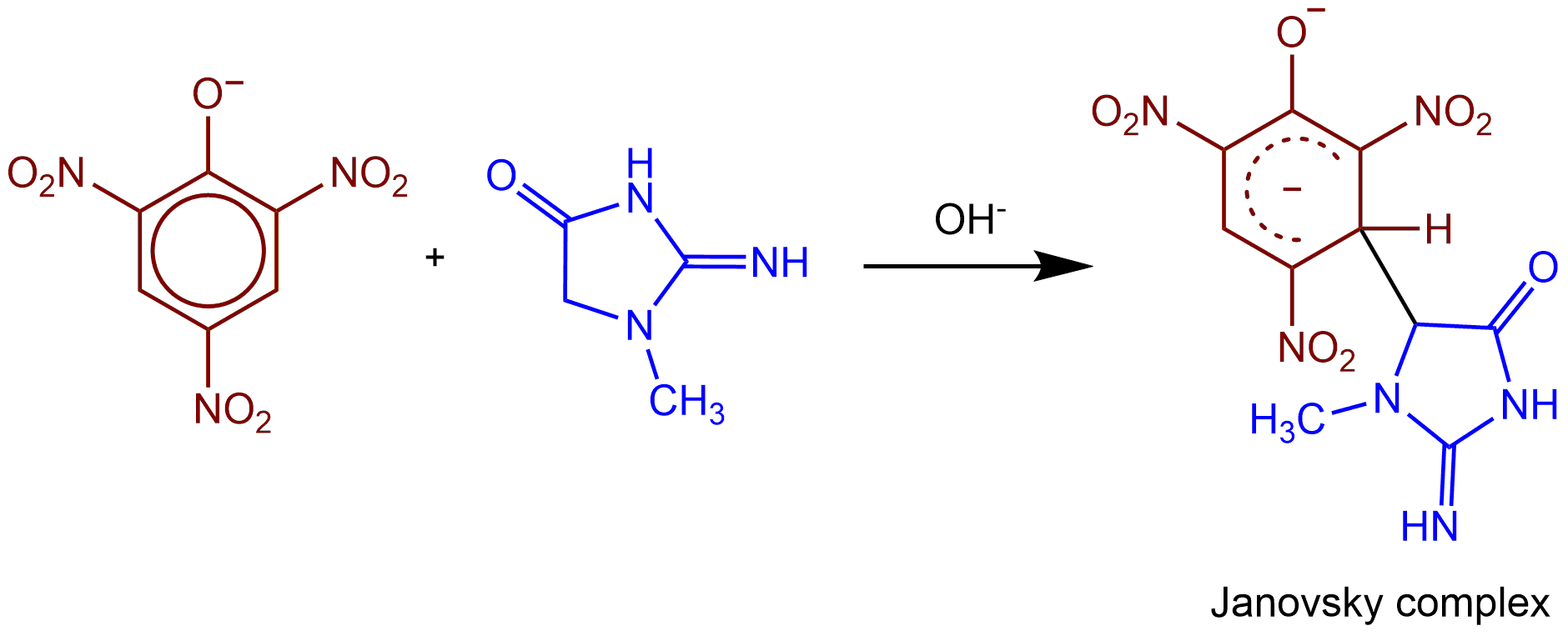
Jaffe Reaction. Picric acid reacts with creatinine with formation of Janovsky complex

== Max Jaffe ==
Max Jaffe was a distinguished 19th-century German biochemist, pathologist, pharmacologist, and professor. He was born on July 25, 1841, in what was formerly Grünberg, Silesia and is now Zielona Góra, Poland. While attending medical school at the University of Berlin, he studied under Ludwig Traube and Wilhelm Kühne. Afterward, he worked as an assistant in a medical clinic in Königsberg. There, he co-authored a paper on putrid sputum with Ernst Viktor von Leyden that led to the discovery of certain characteristic putrid processes in the lungs. After earning his degree in internal medicine, he served in the Franco-Prussian War and was decorated with the Iron Cross Second Class. The title of Extraordinary Professor of Medicinal Chemistry was awarded to him in 1872 and the following year he became the first Ordinary Professor of Pharmacology at the University of Königsberg. He was promoted to director of the Laboratory for Medical Chemistry and Experimental Pharmacology in 1878 and became a member of the Deutsche Akademie der Naturforscher Leopoldina in 1882. Aside from studying creatinine, he is also known for discovering urobilin and urobilinogen in urine and found that these compounds originated in bile. He died on October 26, 1911, in Berlin and is buried in the Weißensee Cemetery.

=== "...eine neue Reaktion des Kreatinins" ===
Creatinine was first synthesized in vitro by Ivan Horbaczewski in 1885. One year later, Jaffe's research was published in the paper Über den Niederschlag, welchen Pikrinsäre in normalem Harn erzeugt und über eine neue Reaction des Kreatinins. Jaffe had noticed that, when mixed in a sodium hydroxide (NaOH) solution, picric acid and creatinine formed a reddish-orange color and needle-like crystal precipitate. By using zinc chloride in a process known as the Neubauer reaction, and then performing the Weyl's test, a colorimetric reaction using sodium nitroprusside (SNP), he determined that the precipitated compound was a double salt of the solution. Although he found the amount of precipitate directly proportional to the creatinine concentration, he also noted that the reaction was highly nonspecific and could be observed with many other organic compounds.

== Clinical applications ==
Blood sample information for creatinine assays

based on the Jaffe reaction.

Serum
Plasma
Non-interfering Anticoagulants

- Sodium heparin
- Potassium heparin
- Lithium heparin
- EDTA
Interferents
- Hemolysis – falsely increases result.
- Icteremia – falsely decreases result.
- Lipemia – falsely decreases result.
- Ammonium heparin – falsely increases result.
- Non-specific chromogens such as protein, glucose, acetoacetate, ascorbic acid, cephalosporins, ammonium – falsely increase results.

Although Jaffe's name is synonymous with clinical creatinine testing, his paper only described the principle behind what would later become the enduring method. It was Otto Folin (1867–1934), a Harvard biochemist, who adapted Jaffe's research—abandoning the standard Neubauer reaction of the time—and published several papers using the Jaffe reaction to analyze creatinine levels in both blood and urine. Folin began using the picric acid procedure in 1901 and included it in his 1916 Lab Manual of Biological Chemistry. During his career, Folin modified and improved several quantitative colorimetric procedures, the first of which was for creatinine. He took advantage of technology available at the time, using a Duboscq colorimeter for measurement precision, and is credited for introducing colorimetry into modern biochemical analysis.

Folin's research did not focus on creatinine as a renal function indicator. Since the precursors of creatinine are synthesized in the liver, at this point in history, creatinine was considered indicative of liver function. It was not until 1926 that Poul Kristian Brandt Rehberg suggested creatinine was a significant marker for renal function.

=== Interfering chromogens ===
The nonspecificity of Jaffe's reaction causes falsely elevated creatinine results in the presence of protein, glucose, acetoacetate, ascorbic acid, guanidine, acetone, cephalosporins, aminoglycosides (mainly streptomycin), ketone bodies, α-keto acids, and other organic compounds. Ammonium is also an interferent; if the sample is plasma, care needs to be taken that ammonium heparin has not been used as an anticoagulant. Nonspecificity is markedly decreased in urine samples since urine creatinine levels are much higher than blood and it generally does not contain significant levels of interfering chromogens.

The Jaffe reaction's nonspecificity remains an important issue. Diabetes patients are a high-risk population to develop chronic kidney disease (CKD) and, therefore, interferences from glucose and acetoacetate are of particular importance.

Artifacts such as hemolysis, lipemia, and icteremia can also affect accuracy. Hemolysis releases Jaffe-reacting chromogens and therefore will falsely increase results. Lipemia and icteremia can inhibit optical readings and falsely decrease values. The procedure has been developed over time with the intention to minimize these interferents.

=== From Neubauer to SRM 967 ===
Before Jaffe, Neubauer described a similar precipitation reaction by mixing creatinine with zinc chloride (ZnCl_{2}) and performing a Weyl's test—the addition of SNP to NaOH and then incubating with acetic acid (CH_{3}CO_{2}H) to develop a color change. Until Folin developed Jaffe's reaction into a clinical procedure, Neubauer's method was how creatinine was measured. As Folin's method evolved, various techniques were implemented to remove Jaffe-reacting substances, mostly protein, from the sample and increase specificity. By the 1950s, precipitated aluminum silicate, called Lloyd's reagent, was being used to remove protein from serum, further improving accuracy. Fuller's earth was also used for protein-binding, but the reference method until the 1980s was adsorption with Lloyd's reagent. New concerns arose due to non-standardization of procedures; different labs were reading results at different endpoints. This problem was resolved with the advent of automated analyzers in the 1960s and 1970s, which introduced a kinetic reading of results rather than a specific endpoint. Kinetic Jaffe methods involve mixing serum with alkaline picrate and reading the rate of change in absorption spectrophotometrically at 520 nm. This not only standardized the procedure, but also removed the need for sample deproteinization. It also introduced two new problems—analyzers used an algorithmic compensation to correct for pseudochromogens, and calibrations were not yet standardized between instruments.

The 1980s saw several new technologies that promised to change the way creatinine testing was done. Enzymatic and ion-exchange methods provided better accuracy but had other drawbacks. Enzymatic methods reduced some interferences but other new ones were discovered. High-performance liquid chromatography, HPLC, was more sensitive and specific, and had become the new reference method endorsed by the American Association for Clinical Chemistry. HPLC addressed the shortcomings of Jaffe-based methods, but was labor-intensive, expensive, and therefore impractical for routine analysis of the most frequently ordered renal analyte in medical labs. Simple, easily automated and cost-effective, Jaffe-based methods have persisted into the 21st century, despite their imperfections.

By 2006, isotope dilution mass spectrometry (IDMS) became the reference method. To improve the accuracy in creatinine testing, new standards were developed by the National Institute of Standards and Technology (NIST). The College of American Pathologists (CAP) and the National Kidney Disease Education Program (NKDEP) collaborated with NIST to develop a new control reference called standard reference material 967 (SRM 967). SRM 967 aims to standardize calibration of creatinine testing, including Jaffe methods. Use of both IDMS and SRM 967 are currently recommended by the National Institutes of Health.

== Works ==
- Über den Niederschlag, welchen Pikrinsäre in normalem Harn erzeugt und über eine neue Reaction des Kreatinins by Max Jaffe (1886)

== See also ==
- Creatinine — the most commonly ordered clinical test to determine renal function.
- Otto Folin — developed the Jaffe reaction into its clinical application.
