= Aminohippuric acid =

Chemical compound

Aminohippurate
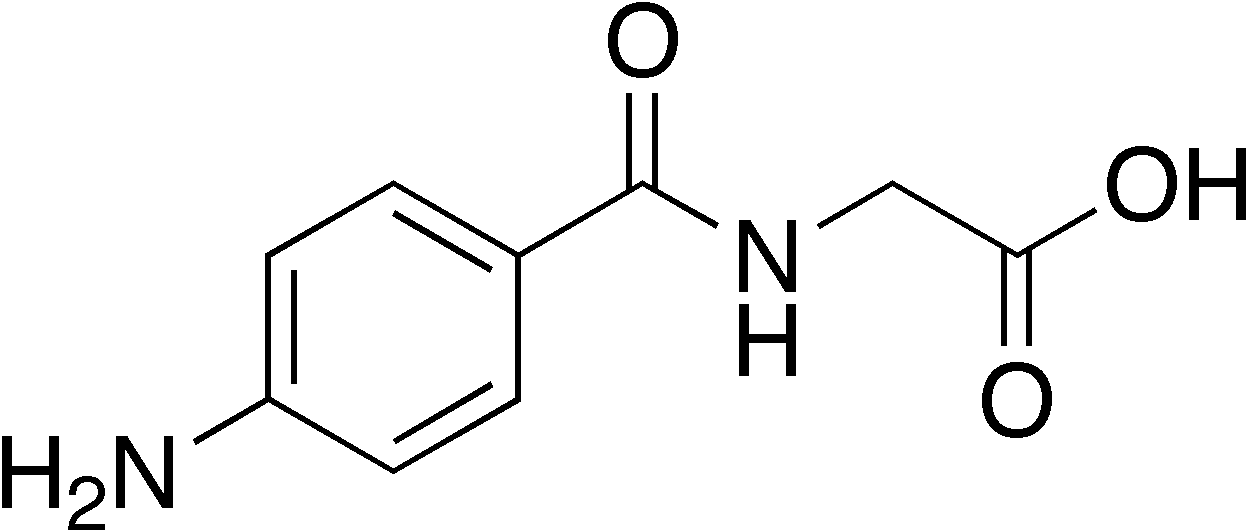

Clinical data
- Other names: PAH, PAHA, Aminohippurate, 4-Aminohippuric acid, N-(4-Aminobenzoyl)glycine, para-Aminohippurate
- ATC code: V04CH30 (WHO)

Identifiers
- IUPAC name: (4-Aminobenzamido)acetic acid
- CAS Number: 61-78-9 94-16-6 (sodium salt)
- PubChem CID: 2148
- IUPHAR/BPS: 4810
- DrugBank: DB00345
- ChemSpider: 2063
- UNII: Y79XT83BJ9
- KEGG: D06890
- ChEBI: CHEBI:104011
- ChEMBL: ChEMBL463
- NIAID ChemDB: 019143
- CompTox Dashboard (EPA): DTXSID7022590
- ECHA InfoCard: 100.000.472

Chemical and physical data
- Formula: C_{9}H_{10}N_{2}O_{3}
- Molar mass: 194.190 g·mol^{−1}
- 3D model (JSmol): Interactive image
- SMILES: O=C(c1ccc(N)cc1)NCC(=O)O
- InChI: InChI=1S/C9H10N2O3/c10-7-3-1-6(2-4-7)9(14)11-5-8(12)13/h1-4H,5,10H2,(H,11,14)(H,12,13); Key:HSMNQINEKMPTIC-UHFFFAOYSA-N

Aminohippuric acid or para-aminohippuric acid (PAH), a derivative of hippuric acid, is a diagnostic agent useful in medical tests involving the kidney used in the measurement of renal plasma flow. It is an amide derivative of the amino acid glycine and para-aminobenzoic acid that is not naturally found in humans; it needs to be IV infused before diagnostic use.

== Uses ==
=== Diagnostics ===
PAH is useful for the measurement of renal plasma flow.

The renal extraction ratio of PAH in a normal individual is approximately 0.92. This means that unlike inulin and creatinine, which are filtered in the glomerulus and ignored by the rest of the kidney, aminohippuric acid is both filtered and secreted, being almost entirely removed from the bloodstream in a normal kidney.

=== Pharmaceuticals ===
Aminohippuric acid is often used as the sodium salt sodium para-aminohippurate. During World War II, para-aminohippurate was given along with penicillin in order to prolong the time penicillin circulated in the blood. Because both penicillin and para-aminohippurate compete for the same transporter in the kidney, administering para-aminohippurate with penicillin decreased the clearance of penicillin from the body by the kidney, providing better antibacterial therapy. Transporters found in the kidney eliminate organic anions and cations from the blood by moving substances, in this case, drug metabolites, from blood into urine.

== Other ==
pK_{a} = 3.83

== See also ==
- PAH clearance
- Ortho-iodohippurate
