= Glomerular filtration rate =

Renal function test

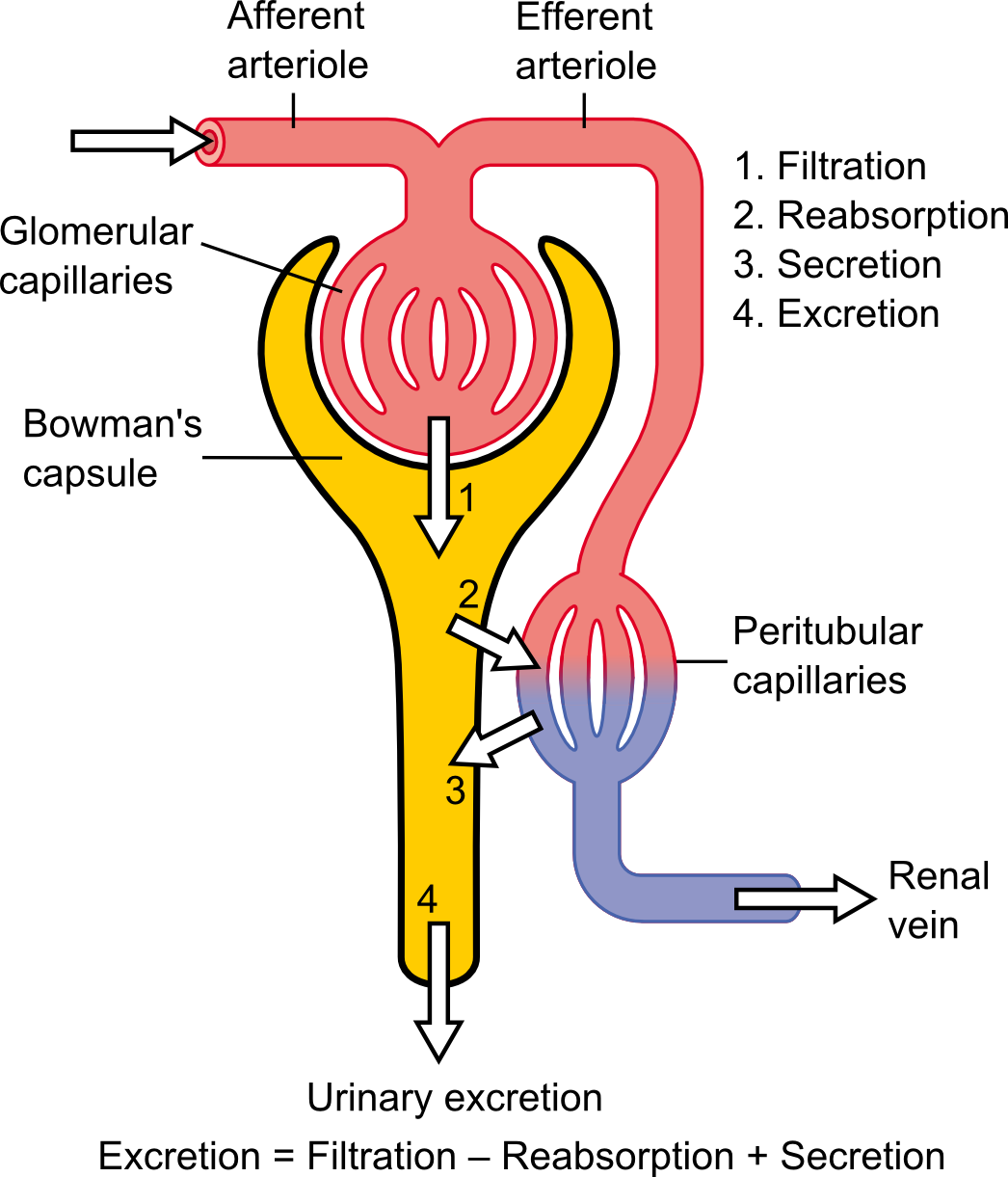
Diagram showing a schematic nephron and its blood supply. The basic physiologic mechanisms of handling fluid and electrolytes by the nephron—filtration, secretion, reabsorption, and excretion—are labelled.

Renal functions include maintaining an acid–base balance; regulating fluid balance; regulating sodium, potassium, and other electrolytes; clearing toxins; absorption of glucose, amino acids, and other small molecules; regulation of blood pressure; production of various hormones, such as erythropoietin; and activation of vitamin D.

The kidney has many functions, which a well-functioning kidney realizes by filtering blood in a process known as glomerular filtration. A major measure of kidney function is the glomerular filtration rate (GFR). The glomerular filtration rate is the flow rate of filtered fluid through the kidney. The creatinine clearance rate (C_{Cr} or CrCl) is the volume of blood plasma that is cleared of creatinine per unit time and is a useful measure for approximating the GFR. Creatinine clearance exceeds GFR due to creatinine secretion, which can be blocked by cimetidine. Both GFR and C_{Cr} may be accurately calculated by comparative measurements of substances in the blood and urine, or estimated by formulas using just a blood test result (eGFR and eC_{Cr}). The results of these tests are used to assess the excretory function of the kidneys. Staging of chronic kidney disease is based on categories of GFR as well as albuminuria and cause of kidney disease.

Estimated GFR (eGFR) is recommended by clinical practice guidelines and regulatory agencies for routine evaluation of GFR whereas measured GFR (mGFR) is recommended as a confirmatory test when more accurate assessment is required.

== Definition ==
Glomerular filtration rate (GFR) is the volume of fluid filtered from the renal (kidney) glomerular capillaries into the Bowman's capsule per unit time.

GFR is equal to the renal clearance rate when any solute is freely filtered and is neither reabsorbed nor secreted by the kidneys. The rate therefore measured is the quantity of the substance in the urine that originated from a calculable volume of blood. Relating this principle to the below equation – for the substance used, the product of urine concentration and urine flow equals the mass of substance excreted during the time that urine has been collected. This mass equals the mass filtered at the glomerulus as nothing is added or removed in the nephron. Dividing this mass by the plasma concentration gives the volume of plasma which the mass must have originally come from, and thus the volume of plasma fluid that has entered Bowman's capsule within the aforementioned period of time. The GFR is typically recorded in units of volume per time, e.g., milliliters per minute (mL/min). Compare to filtration fraction.

$$GFR = \frac { \mbox{Urine concentration} \times \mbox{urine flow} }{ \mbox{Plasma concentration} }$$

There are several different techniques used to calculate or estimate the glomerular filtration rate (GFR or eGFR). The above formula only applies for GFR calculation when it is equal to the clearance rate.

== Regulation ==
Central to the physiologic maintenance of GFR is the differential vasoconstriction of the afferent (input) and efferent (output) arterioles. Vasodilation of the afferent or vasoconstriction of the efferent arteriole increases GFR. Conversely, vasoconstriction of the afferent or vasodilation of the efferent will decrease GFR.

There are multiple mechanisms that the body has to regulate the constriction or dilation of these arterioles: local feedback within the kidney, hormonal regulation, and sympathetic nervous control. These systems are closely intertwined. The kidney can maintain a relatively constant GFR even as mean arterial pressure changes.

Local feedback within the kidney (renal autoregulation) includes the myogenic response and tuberoglomerular feedback. In the myogenic response, increased stretch of the afferent arteriole due to higher blood pressure results in afferent vasoconstriction, thereby preventing an increase in GFR. With tuberoglomerular feedback, the macula densa cells at the downstream nephron tubule senses changes in ion levels. If sodium chloride sodium levels in the urinary filtrate are too high, the macula densa signals to constrict the afferent arteriole; if too low, the signal is to vasodilate the afferent arteriole and to release renin (activating the RAAS system).

The RAAS system is the major hormonal control of GFR. Low blood pressure activates the RAAS system, increasing the amount of the hormone angiotensin II. Angiotensin II binds to receptors on the efferent arteriole; the resulting efferent vasoconstriction increases GFR.

There is sympathetic innervation of both afferent and efferent arterioles at the glomerulus. Sympathetic activation, for instance during a state of stress, causes vasoconstriction of both the afferent and efferent arterioles. This decreases renal blood flow and GFR. Sympathetic activation also causes the release of renin.

== Measurement ==
=== Creatinine ===
In clinical practice, creatinine clearance or estimates of creatinine clearance based on the serum creatinine level are used to measure GFR. Creatinine is produced naturally by the body (creatinine is a breakdown product of creatine phosphate, which is found in muscle). It is freely filtered by the glomerulus, but also actively secreted by the peritubular capillaries in very small amounts such that creatinine clearance overestimates actual GFR by 10–20%. This margin of error is acceptable, considering the ease with which creatinine clearance is measured. Unlike precise GFR measurements involving constant infusions of inulin, creatinine is already at a steady-state concentration in the blood, and so measuring creatinine clearance is much less cumbersome. However, creatinine estimates of GFR have their limitations. All of the estimating equations depend on a prediction of the 24-hour creatinine excretion rate, which is a function of muscle mass which is quite variable. One of the equations, the Cockcroft and Gault equation (see below) does not correct for race. With a higher muscle mass, serum creatinine will be higher for any given rate of clearance.

=== Inulin ===
The GFR can be determined by injecting inulin or the inulin analog sinistrin into the blood stream. Since both inulin and sinistrin are neither reabsorbed nor secreted by the kidney after glomerular filtration, their rate of excretion is directly proportional to the rate of filtration of water and solutes across the glomerular filter. Incomplete urine collection is an important source of error in inulin clearance measurement. Using inulin to measure kidney function is the "gold standard" for comparison with other means of estimating glomerular filtration rate. In 2018, the French pharmacovigilance agency withdrew inulin and sinistrin-based products from the market after some patients experienced hypersensitivity reactions including a fatal outcome. Consequently, the contrast agents iohexol and iothalamate have become more popular alternatives to determine GFR and are considered to show sufficient accuracy to determine GFR.

=== Radioactive tracers ===
GFR can be accurately measured using radioactive substances, in particular chromium-51 and technetium-99m. These come close to the ideal properties of inulin (undergoing only glomerular filtration) but can be measured more practically with only a few urine or blood samples. Measurement of renal or plasma clearance of ^{51}Cr-EDTA is widely used in Europe but not available in the United States, where ^{99m}Tc-DTPA may be used instead. Renal and plasma clearance ^{51}Cr-EDTA has been shown to be accurate in comparison with the gold standard, inulin. Use of ^{51}Cr‑EDTA is considered a reference standard measure in UK guidance.

=== Cystatin C ===
Problems with creatinine (varying muscle mass, recent meat ingestion (much less dependent on the diet than urea), etc.) have led to evaluation of alternative agents for estimation of GFR. One of these is cystatin C, a ubiquitous protein secreted by most cells in the body (it is an inhibitor of cysteine protease).

Cystatin C is freely filtered at the glomerulus. After filtration, Cystatin C is reabsorbed and catabolized by the tubular epithelial cells, with only small amounts excreted in the urine. Cystatin C levels are therefore measured not in the urine, but in the bloodstream.

Equations have been developed linking estimated GFR to serum cystatin C levels. Most recently, some proposed equations have combined sex, age, adjusted cystatin C and creatinine. In 2022, the National Kidney Foundation (NKF) and American Society of Nephrology (ASN)'s Joint Task Force on Reassessing the Inclusion of Race in Diagnosing Kidney Diseases recommended national efforts to facilitate increased, routine, and timely use of cystatin C. They noted that cystatin C would be useful particularly to confirm estimated GFR in adults who are at risk for or have chronic kidney disease. They suggested that combining filtration markers (creatinine and cystatin C) is more accurate and would support better clinical decisions than either marker alone.

== Calculation ==
More precisely, GFR is the fluid flow rate between the glomerular capillaries and the Bowman's capsule:

$Q={\operatorname{d}V\over\operatorname{d}t} = K_f \times (P_G - P_B - \Pi_G + \Pi_B)$

Where:

- $Q$ is the GFR.
- $K_f$ is called the filtration constant and is defined as the product of the hydraulic conductivity and the surface area of the glomerular capillaries.
- $P_G$ is the hydrostatic pressure within the glomerular capillaries.
- $P_B$ is the hydrostatic pressure within the Bowman's capsule.
- $\Pi_G$ is the colloid osmotic pressure within the glomerular capillaries.
- and $\Pi_B$ is the colloid osmotic pressure within the Bowman's capsule.

=== K_{f} ===
Because this constant is a measurement of hydraulic conductivity multiplied by the capillary surface area, it is almost impossible to measure physically. However, it can be determined experimentally. Methods of determining the GFR are listed in the above and below sections and it is clear from our equation that $K_f$ can be found by dividing the experimental GFR by the net filtration pressure:

$$K_f = \frac{\textrm{GFR}}{\text{Net Filt. Pressure}}=\frac{\textrm{GFR}}{(P_G - P_B - \Pi_G + \Pi_B)}$$

=== P_{G} ===
The hydrostatic pressure within the glomerular capillaries is determined by the pressure difference between the fluid entering immediately from the afferent arteriole and leaving through the efferent arteriole. The pressure difference is approximated by the product of the total resistance of the respective arteriole and the flux of blood through it:

$$P_a - P_G = R_a \times Q_a$$

$$P_G - P_e = R_e \times Q_e$$

Where:

- $P_a$ is the afferent arteriole pressure.
- $P_G$ is the hydrostatic pressure within the glomerular capillaries.
- $P_e$ is the efferent arteriole pressure.
- $R_a$ is the afferent arteriole resistance.
- $R_e$ is the efferent arteriole resistance.
- $Q_a$ is the afferent arteriole flux.
- And, $Q_e$ is the efferent arteriole flux.

=== P_{B} ===
The pressure in the Bowman's capsule and proximal tubule can be determined by the difference between the pressure in the Bowman's capsule and the descending tubule:

$$P_B - P_d = R_d \times (Q_a - Q_e)$$

Where:

- $P_d$ is the pressure in the descending tubule.
- And, $R_d$ is the resistance of the descending tubule.

=== Π_{G} ===
Blood plasma has a good many proteins in it and they exert an inward directed force called the osmotic pressure on the water in hypotonic solutions across a membrane, i.e., in the Bowman's capsule. Because plasma proteins are virtually incapable of escaping the glomerular capillaries, this oncotic pressure is defined, simply, by the ideal gas law:

$$\Pi_G = RTc$$

Where:

- R is the universal gas constant
- T is the temperature.
- And, c is concentration in mol/L of plasma proteins (remember the solutes can freely diffuse through the glomerular capsule).

=== Π_{B} ===
This value is almost always taken to be equal to zero because in a healthy nephron, there should be no proteins in the Bowman's capsule.

== Clearance and filtration fraction ==
=== Filtration fraction ===
The filtration fraction is the amount of plasma that is actually filtered through the kidney. This can be defined using the equation:

FF=GFR/RPF

- FF is the filtration fraction
- GFR is the glomerular filtration rate
- RPF is the renal plasma flow

Normal human FF is 20%.

=== Renal clearance ===
C_{x}=(U_{x})V/P_{x}

- C_{x} is the clearance of X (normally in units of mL/min).
- U_{x} is the urine concentration of X.
- P_{x} is the plasma concentration of X.
- V is the urine flow rate.

== Estimation ==
In clinical practice, however, creatinine clearance or estimates of creatinine clearance based on the serum creatinine level are used to measure GFR. Creatinine is produced naturally by the body (creatinine is a breakdown product of creatine phosphate, which is found in muscle). It is freely filtered by the glomerulus, but also actively secreted by the peritubular capillaries in very small amounts such that creatinine clearance overestimates actual GFR by 10–20%. This margin of error is acceptable, considering the ease with which creatinine clearance is measured. Unlike precise GFR measurements involving constant infusions of inulin, creatinine is already at a steady-state concentration in the blood, and so measuring creatinine clearance is much less cumbersome. However, creatinine estimates of GFR have their limitations. All of the estimating equations depend on a prediction of the 24-hour creatinine excretion rate, which is a function of muscle mass which is quite variable. The Cockcroft-Gault and CKD-EPI 2021 equations (see below) do not correct for race. With a higher muscle mass, serum creatinine will be higher for any given rate of clearance.

A common mistake made when just looking at serum creatinine is the failure to account for muscle mass. Hence, an older woman with a serum creatinine of 1.4 mg/dL may actually have a moderately severe chronic kidney disease, whereas a young muscular male can have a normal level of renal function at this serum creatinine level. Creatinine-based equations should be used with caution in cachectic patients and patients with cirrhosis. They often have very low muscle mass and a much lower creatinine excretion rate than predicted by the equations below, such that a cirrhotic patient with a serum creatinine of 0.9 mg/dL may have a moderately severe degree of chronic kidney disease.

Estimated GFR (eGFR) is recommended by clinical practice guidelines and regulatory agencies for routine evaluation of GFR whereas measured GFR (mGFR) is recommended as a confirmatory test when more accurate assessment is required.

=== Creatinine clearance C_{Cr} ===
One method of determining GFR from creatinine is to collect urine (usually for 24 h) to determine the amount of creatinine that was removed from the blood over a given time interval. If one removes 1440 mg in 24 h, this is equivalent to removing 1 mg/min. If the blood concentration is 0.01 mg/mL (1 mg/dL), then one can say that 100 mL/min of blood is being "cleared" of creatinine, since, to get 1 mg of creatinine, 100 mL of blood containing 0.01 mg/mL would need to have been cleared.

Creatinine clearance (C_{Cr}) is calculated from the creatinine concentration in the collected urine sample (U_{Cr}), urine flow rate (Vdt), and the plasma concentration (P_{Cr}). Since the product of urine concentration and urine flow rate yields creatinine excretion rate, which is the rate of removal from the blood, creatinine clearance is calculated as removal rate per min (U_{Cr}×Vdt) divided by the plasma creatinine concentration. This is commonly represented mathematically as

$$C_{Cr} = \frac { U_{Cr} \times \dot{V} }{ P_{Cr} }$$

Example: A person has a plasma creatinine concentration of 0.01 mg/mL and in 1 hour produces 60 mL of urine with a creatinine concentration of 1.25 mg/mL.

$$C_{Cr} = \frac \mathrm{1.25\ mg/mL \times \frac{60\ mL}{60\ min}}\mathrm{0.01\ mg/mL} = \frac \mathrm{ {1.25\ mg/mL} \times {1\ mL/min}}\mathrm{0.01\ mg/mL} = \frac \mathrm{1.25\ mg/min}\mathrm{0.01\ mg/mL} = \mathrm{125\ mL/min}$$

The common procedure involves undertaking a 24-hour urine collection, from empty-bladder one morning to the contents of the bladder the following morning, with a comparative blood test then taken. The urinary flow rate is still calculated per minute, hence:

$$C_{Cr} = \frac { U_{Cr} \ \times \ \text{24-hour volume} }\mathrm{P_{Cr} \ \times \ 24 \times 60\ min}$$

To allow comparison of results between people of different sizes, the C_{Cr} is often corrected for the body surface area (BSA) and expressed compared to the average sized man as mL/min/1.73 m^{2}. While most adults have a BSA that approaches 1.7 m^{2} (1.6 m^{2} to 1.9 m^{2}), extremely obese or slim patients should have their C_{Cr} corrected for their actual BSA.

$$C_\text{Cr-corrected} = \frac{{C_{Cr}} \ \times \ {BSA}} \mathrm{1.73}$$
BSA can be calculated on the basis of weight and height.

Twenty-four-hour urine collection to assess creatinine clearance is no longer widely performed, due to difficulty in assuring complete specimen collection. To assess the adequacy of a complete collection, one always calculates the amount of creatinine excreted over a 24-hour period. This amount varies with muscle mass and is higher in young people/old, and in men/women. An unexpectedly low or high 24-hour creatinine excretion rate voids the test. Nevertheless, in cases where estimates of creatinine clearance from serum creatinine are unreliable, creatinine clearance remains a useful test. These cases include "estimation of GFR in individuals with variation in dietary intake (vegetarian diet, creatine supplements) or muscle mass (amputation, malnutrition, muscle wasting), since these factors are not specifically taken into account in prediction equations."

A number of formulae have been devised to estimate GFR or C_{cr} values on the basis of serum creatinine levels. Where not otherwise stated serum creatinine is assumed to be stated in mg/dL, not μmol/L—divide by 88.4 to convert from μmol/Lto mg/dL.

=== Cockcroft–Gault formula ===
A commonly used surrogate marker for the estimation of creatinine clearance is the Cockcroft–Gault (CG) formula, which in turn estimates GFR in mL/min: It is named after the scientists, the asthmologist Donald William Cockcroft (b. 1946) and the nephrologist Matthew Henry Gault (1925–2003), who first published the formula in 1976, and it employs serum creatinine measurements and a patient's weight to predict the creatinine clearance. The formula, as originally published, is:

$$eC_{Cr} = \frac { \mathrm{(140 - Age)} \ \times \ \text{Mass (in kilograms)} \ \times \ [\text{0.85 if Female}]} {\mathrm{72} \ \times \ [\text{Serum Creatinine (in mg/dL)}]}$$
This formula expects weight to be measured in kilograms and creatinine to be measured in mg/dL, as is standard in the US. The resulting value is multiplied by a constant of 0.85 if the patient is female. This formula is useful because the calculations are simple and can often be performed without the aid of a calculator.

When serum creatinine is measured in μmol/L:

$$eC_{Cr} = \frac { \mathrm{(140 - Age)} \ \times \ \text{Mass (in kilograms)} \ \times \ \text{Constant} } {[\text{Serum Creatinine (in } \mu \mathrm{mol/L)}]}$$
Where Constant is 1.23 for men and 1.04 for women.

One interesting feature of the Cockcroft and Gault equation is that it shows how dependent the estimation of CCr is based on age. The age term is (140 – age). This means that a 20-year-old person (140 – 20 = 120) will have twice the creatinine clearance as an 80-year-old (140 – 80 = 60) for the same level of serum creatinine. The C-G equation assumes that a woman will have a 15% lower creatinine clearance than a man at the same level of serum creatinine.

=== Modification of diet in renal disease (MDRD) formula ===
Another formula for calculating the GFR is the one developed by the Modification of Diet in Renal Disease Study Group. Most laboratories in Australia, and the United Kingdom calculate and report the estimated GFR along with creatinine measurements and this forms the basis of diagnosis of chronic kidney disease. The adoption of the automatic reporting of MDRD-eGFR has been widely criticised.

The most commonly used formula is the "4-variable MDRD", which estimates GFR using four variables: serum creatinine, age, ethnicity, and gender. The original MDRD used six variables with the additional variables being the blood urea nitrogen and albumin levels. The equations have been validated in patients with chronic kidney disease; however, both versions underestimate the GFR in healthy patients with GFRs over 60 mL/min. The equations have not been validated in acute renal failure.

For creatinine in μmol/L:

$$\text{eGFR} = \text{32788}\ \times \ [\text{Serum Creatinine}]^{-1.154} \ \times \ \text{Age}^{-0.203} \ \times \text{[1.212 if Black]} \ \times \text{[0.742 if Female]}$$

For creatinine in mg/dL:

$$\text{eGFR} = \text{186}\ \times \ [\text{Serum Creatinine}]^{-1.154} \ \times \ \text{Age}^{-0.203} \ \times \text{[1.212 if Black]} \ \times \text{[0.742 if Female]}$$

Creatinine levels in μmol/L can be converted to mg/dL by dividing them by 88.4. The 32788 number above is equal to 186×88.4^{1.154}.

A more elaborate version of the MDRD equation also includes serum albumin and blood urea nitrogen (BUN) levels:

$$\text{eGFR} = \text{170}\ \times \ [\text{Serum Creatinine}]^{-0.999} \ \times \ \text{Age}^{-0.176} \ \times \text{[0.762 if Female]} \ \times \text{[1.180 if Black]} \ \times \ \text{BUN}^{-0.170} \ \times \ \text{Albumin}^{+0.318}$$
where the creatinine and blood urea nitrogen concentrations are both in mg/dL. The albumin concentration is in g/dL.

These MDRD equations are to be used only if the laboratory has NOT calibrated its serum creatinine measurements to isotope dilution mass spectrometry (IDMS). When IDMS-calibrated serum creatinine is used (which is about 6% lower), the above equations should be multiplied by 175/186 or by 0.94086.

Since these formulae do not adjust for body size, results are given in units of mL/min per 1.73 m^{2}, 1.73 m^{2} being the estimated body surface area of an adult with a mass of 63 kg and a height of 1.7 m.

Plots of estimated glomerular filtration rate vs serum creatinine using different measures (columns) and for males (top row) and females (bottom row)

=== CKD-EPI formula ===
The CKD-EPI (Chronic Kidney Disease Epidemiology Collaboration) formula was first published in May 2009. It was developed in an effort to create a formula more accurate than the MDRD formula, especially when actual GFR is greater than 60 mL/min per 1.73 m^{2}. This is the formula recommended as of 2014 by NICE in the UK.

Researchers pooled data from multiple studies to develop and validate this new equation. They used 10 studies that included 8254 participants, randomly using 2/3 of the data sets for development and the other 1/3 for internal validation. Sixteen additional studies, which included 3896 participants, were used for external validation.

The CKD-EPI equation performed better than the MDRD (Modification of Diet in Renal Disease Study) equation, especially at higher GFR, with less bias and greater accuracy. When looking at NHANES (National Health and Nutrition Examination Survey) data, the median estimated GFR was 94.5 mL/min per 1.73 m^{2} vs. 85.0 mL/min per 1.73 m^{2}, and the prevalence of chronic kidney disease was 11.5% versus 13.1%. Despite its overall superiority to the MDRD equation, the CKD-EPI equations performed poorly in certain populations, including black women, the elderly and the obese, and was less popular among clinicians than the MDRD estimate.

The 2009 CKD-EPI equation is:

$$\mathrm{eGFR} = 141\ \times \ \mathrm{\min(SCr/k,1)}^{a} \ \times \ \mathrm{\max(SCr/k,1)}^{-1.209} \ \times \ 0.993^\text{Age} \ \times \text{[1.018 if Female]} \ \times \text{[1.159 if Black]} \$$

where SCr is serum creatinine (mg/dL), k is 0.7 for females and 0.9 for males, a is −0.329 for females and −0.411 for males, min indicates the minimum of SCr/k or 1, and max indicates the maximum of SCr/k or 1.

As separate equations for different populations: For creatinine (IDMS calibrated) in mg/dL:

Male, not black
If serum creatinine (Scr) ≤ 0.9

$$\mathrm{eGFR} = 141\ \times \ \mathrm{(SCr/0.9)}^{-0.411} \ \times \ 0.993^\text{Age} \$$

If serum creatinine (Scr) > 0.9

$$\mathrm{eGFR} = 141\ \times \ \mathrm{(SCr/0.9)}^{-1.209} \ \times \ 0.993^\text{Age} \$$

Female, not black
If serum creatinine (Scr) ≤ 0.7

$$\mathrm{eGFR} = 144\ \times \ \mathrm{(SCr/0.7)}^{-0.329} \ \times \ 0.993^\text{Age} \$$

If serum creatinine (Scr) > 0.7

$$\mathrm{eGFR} = 144\ \times \ \mathrm{(SCr/0.7)}^{-1.209} \ \times \ 0.993^\text{Age} \$$

Black male
If serum creatinine (Scr) ≤ 0.9

$$\mathrm{eGFR} = 163\ \times \ \mathrm{(SCr/0.9)}^{-0.411} \ \times \ 0.993^\text{Age} \$$

If serum creatinine (Scr) > 0.9

$$\mathrm{eGFR} = 163\ \times \ \mathrm{(SCr/0.9)}^{-1.209} \ \times \ 0.993^\text{Age} \$$

Black female
If serum creatinine (Scr) ≤ 0.7

$$\mathrm{eGFR} = 166\ \times \ \mathrm{(SCr/0.7)}^{-0.329} \ \times \ 0.993^\text{Age} \$$

If serum creatinine (Scr) > 0.7

$$\mathrm{eGFR} = 166\ \times \ \mathrm{(SCr/0.7)}^{-1.209} \ \times \ 0.993^\text{Age} \$$

This formula was developed by Levey et al.

The 2009 CKD-EPI formula was suggested to improve cardiovascular risk prediction over the MDRD Study formula in a middle-age population.

The 2021 CKD-EPI formula does not include a race coefficient (see discussion below). The 2021 CKD-EPI equation is:

$$\mathrm{eGFR} = 142\ \times \ \mathrm{\min(SCr/k,1)}^{a} \ \times \ \mathrm{\max(SCr/k,1)}^{-1.209} \ \times \ 0.9938^\text{Age} \ \times \text{[1.012 if Female]} \$$

where SCr is serum creatinine (mg/dL), k is 0.7 for females and 0.9 for males, a is −0.241 for females and −0.302 for males, min indicates the minimum of SCr/k or 1, and max indicates the maximum of SCr/k or 1.

As separate equations for different populations: For creatinine (IDMS calibrated) in mg/dL:

Male
If serum creatinine (Scr) ≤ 0.9

$$\mathrm{eGFR} = 142\ \times \ \mathrm{(SCr/0.9)}^{-0.302} \ \times \ 0.9938^\text{Age} \$$

If serum creatinine (Scr) > 0.9

$$\mathrm{eGFR} = 142\ \times \ \mathrm{(SCr/0.9)}^{-1.2} \ \times \ 0.9938^\text{Age} \$$

Female
If serum creatinine (Scr) ≤ 0.7

$$\mathrm{eGFR} = 143\ \times \ \mathrm{(SCr/0.7)}^{-0.241} \ \times \ 0.9938^\text{Age} \$$

If serum creatinine (Scr) > 0.7

$$\mathrm{eGFR} = 143\ \times \ \mathrm{(SCr/0.7)}^{-1.2} \ \times \ 0.9938^\text{Age} \$$

=== Mayo Quadratic formula ===
Another estimation tool to calculate GFR is the Mayo Quadratic formula. This formula was developed by Rule et al., in an attempt to better estimate GFR in patients with preserved kidney function. It is well recognized that the MDRD formula tends to underestimate GFR in patients with preserved kidney function. Studies in 2008 found that the Mayo Clinic Quadratic Equation compared moderately well with radionuclide GFR, but had inferior bias and accuracy than the MDRD equation in a clinical setting.

The equation is:

$\text{eGFR} = \text{exp}{(1.911+ 5.249/[\text{Serum Creatinine}] - 2.114/[\text{Serum Creatinine}]^2 - 0.00686 \ \times \ \text{Age} - \text{[0.205 if Female]})}$

If Serum Creatinine < 0.8 mg/dL, use 0.8 mg/dL for Serum Creatinine.

=== Schwartz formula ===
In children, the Schwartz formula is used. This employs the serum creatinine (mg/dL), the child's height (cm) and a constant to estimate the glomerular filtration rate:

$$\text{eGFR} = \frac{ {k} \times \text{Height} }\text{Serum Creatinine}$$
Where k is a constant that depends on muscle mass, which itself varies with a child's age:

In first year of life, for pre-term babies k=0.33 and for full-term infants k=0.45
For infants and children of age 1 to 12 years, k=0.55.

The method of selection of the constant k has been questioned as being dependent upon the gold-standard of renal function used (i.e. inulin clearance, creatinine clearance, etc.) and also may be dependent upon the urinary flow rate at the time of measurement.

In 2009 the formula was updated to use standardized serum creatinine (recommend k=0.413) and additional formulas that allow improved precision were derived if serum cystatin C is measured in addition to serum creatinine.

=== IDMS standardization effort ===
One problem with any creatinine-based equation for GFR is that the methods used to assay creatinine in the blood differ widely in their susceptibility to non-specific chromogens, which cause the creatinine value to be overestimated. In particular, the MDRD equation was derived using serum creatinine measurements that had this problem. The NKDEP program in the United States has attempted to solve this problem by trying to get all laboratories to calibrate their measures of creatinine to a "gold standard", which in this case is isotope dilution mass spectrometry (IDMS). In late 2009 not all labs in the U.S. had changed over to the new system. There are two forms of the MDRD equation that are available, depending on whether or not creatinine was measured by an IDMS-calibrated assay. The CKD-EPI equation is designed to be used with IDMS-calibrated serum creatinine values only.

== Normal ranges ==
The normal range of GFR, adjusted for body surface area, is 100–130 average 125 mL/min/1.73m^{2} in men and 90–120 mL/min/1.73m^{2} in women younger than the age of 40. In children, GFR measured by inulin clearance is 110 mL/min/1.73 m^{2} until 2 years of age in both sexes, and then it progressively decreases. After age 40, GFR decreases progressively with age, by 0.4–1.2 mL/min per year.

== Decreased GFR ==
A decreased renal function can be caused by many types of kidney disease. Upon presentation of decreased renal function, it is recommended to perform a history and physical examination, as well as performing a renal ultrasound and a urinalysis. The most relevant items in the history are medications, edema, nocturia, gross hematuria, family history of kidney disease, diabetes and polyuria. The most important items in a physical examination are signs of vasculitis, lupus erythematosus, diabetes, endocarditis and hypertension.

A urinalysis is helpful even when not showing any pathology, as this finding suggests an extrarenal etiology. Proteinuria and/or urinary sediment usually indicates the presence of glomerular disease. Hematuria may be caused by glomerular disease or by a disease along the urinary tract.

The most relevant assessments in a renal ultrasound are renal sizes, echogenicity and any signs of hydronephrosis. Renal enlargement usually indicates diabetic nephropathy, focal segmental glomerular sclerosis or myeloma. Renal atrophy suggests longstanding chronic renal disease.

=== Chronic kidney disease stages ===
Risk factors for kidney disease include diabetes, high blood pressure, family history, older age, ethnic group and smoking. For most patients, a GFR over 60 mL/min/1.73 m^{2} is adequate. But significant decline of the GFR from a previous test result can be an early indicator of kidney disease requiring medical intervention. The sooner kidney dysfunction is diagnosed and treated the greater odds of preserving remaining nephrons, and preventing the need for dialysis.

CKD stage	GFR level (mL/min/1.73 m^{2})
Stage 1	≥ 90
Stage 2	60–89
Stage 3	30–59
Stage 4	15–29
Stage 5	< 15

The severity of chronic kidney disease (CKD) is described by six stages; the most severe three are defined by the MDRD-eGFR value, and first three also depend on whether there is other evidence of kidney disease (e.g., proteinuria):

0) Normal kidney function – GFR above 90 mL/min/1.73 m^{2} and no proteinuria
1) CKD1 – GFR above 90 mL/min/1.73 m^{2} with evidence of kidney damage
2) CKD2 (mild) – GFR of 60 to 89 mL/min/1.73 m^{2} with evidence of kidney damage
3) CKD3 (moderate) – GFR of 30 to 59 mL/min/1.73 m^{2}
4) CKD4 (severe) – GFR of 15 to 29 mL/min/1.73 m^{2}
5) CKD5 kidney failure – GFR less than 15 mL/min/1.73 m^{2} Some people add CKD5D for those stage 5 patients requiring dialysis; many patients in CKD5 are not yet on dialysis.

Note: others add a "T" to patients who have had a transplant regardless of stage.

Not all clinicians agree with the above classification, suggesting that it may mislabel patients with mildly reduced kidney function, especially the elderly, as having a disease. A conference was held in 2009 regarding these controversies by Kidney Disease: Improving Global Outcomes (KDIGO) on CKD: Definition, Classification and Prognosis, gathering data on CKD prognosis to refine the definition and staging of CKD.

== Removal of race from eGFR calculations ==
In 2017, Beth Israel Deaconess Medical Center dropped the Black race coefficient in their estimated glomerular filtration rate (eGFR) report, resulting in a steady increase in the percentage of Black patients listed before starting dialysis. Hoenig et al said on the topic "Race is a social construct that cannot be measured, can be used imprecisely and may contribute to disparities in kidney transplant access for Black patients."

In 2020, Vyas et al published an article in The New England Journal of Medicine criticizing the use of race in eGFR calculations which resulted in higher reported eGFR values for black-identifying patients. They noted that "The algorithm developers justified these outcomes with evidence of higher average serum creatinine concentrations among black people than among white people. Explanations that have been given for this finding include the notion that black people release more creatinine into their blood at baseline, in part because they are reportedly more muscular. Analyses have cast doubt on this claim, but the "race-corrected" eGFR remains the standard." They concluded saying "As long as uncertainty persists about the cause of racial differences in serum creatinine levels, we should favor practices that may alleviate health inequities over those that may exacerbate them."

In February 2022, the National Kidney Foundation (NKF) and American Society of Nephrology (ASN)'s Joint Task Force on Reassessing the Inclusion of Race in Diagnosing Kidney Diseases recommended use of the 2021 CKD-EPI equation which discontinues using a race modifier.

In July 2022 the OPTN Board eliminated race-based calculations for transplant candidate listing across all transplant hospitals in the US.

== See also ==
- Clearance
- Dialysis
- Filtration fraction
- Kt/V
- Pharmacokinetics
- Renal clearance ratio
- Renal failure
- Standardized Kt/V
- Tubuloglomerular feedback
- Urea reduction ratio
