= Inulin =

Natural plant polysaccharides

Identifiers
| CAS Number | 9005-80-5 |
| ChEMBL | ChEMBL1201646 |
| ChemSpider | 52082957 |
| DrugBank | DB00638 |
| ECHA InfoCard | 100.029.701 |
| KEGG | D00171 |
| PubChem CID | 24763 |
| UNII | JOS53KRJ01 |
| CompTox Dashboard (EPA) | DTXSID70872610 |

Properties
| Chemical formula | C_{6n}H_{10n+2}O_{5n+1} |
| Molar mass | Polymer; depends on n |

Pharmacology
| ATC code | V04CH01 (WHO) |

Hazards
| NFPA 704 (fire diamond) | 1 1 0 |
- Except where otherwise noted, data are given for materials in their standard state (at 25 °C [77 °F], 100 kPa). verify (what is ?) Infobox references

Inulins are a group of naturally occurring polysaccharides produced by many types of plants, industrially most often extracted from chicory. Inulin is used by some plants as a means of storing energy and is typically found in roots or rhizomes. Most plants that synthesize and store inulin do not store other forms of carbohydrate such as starch.

The inulins belong to a class of dietary fiber known as fructans. In 2018, the United States Food and Drug Administration approved inulin as a dietary fiber ingredient used to improve the nutritional value of manufactured food products. Using inulin to measure kidney function is the "gold standard" for comparison with other means of estimating glomerular filtration rate.

== Origin and history ==
Inulin is a natural storage carbohydrate present in more than 36,000 species of plants, including agave, wheat, onion, bananas, garlic, asparagus, Jerusalem artichoke, and chicory. For these plants, inulin is used as an energy reserve and for regulating cold resistance. Because it is soluble in water, it is osmotically active. Certain plants can change the osmotic potential of their cells by changing the degree of polymerization of inulin molecules by hydrolysis. By changing osmotic potential without changing the total amount of carbohydrate, plants can withstand cold and drought during winter periods.

Inulin was discovered in 1804 by German scientist Valentin Rose. He found "a peculiar substance" from Inula helenium roots by boiling-water extraction. In the 1920s, J. Irvine used chemical methods such as methylation to study the molecular structure of inulin, and he designed the isolation method for this new anhydrofructose. During studies of renal tubules in the 1930s, researchers searched for a substance that could serve as a biomarker that is not reabsorbed or secreted after introduction into tubules. A. N. Richards introduced inulin because of its high molecular weight and its resistance to enzymes. Inulin is used to determine glomerular filtration rate of the kidneys.

== Chemical structure and properties ==
Inulin is a heterogeneous collection of fructose polymers. It consists of chain-terminating glucosyl moieties and a repetitive fructosyl moiety, which are linked by β(2,1) bonds. The degree of polymerization (DP) of standard inulin ranges from 2 to 60. After removing the fractions with DP lower than 10 during manufacturing process, the remaining product is high-performance inulin. Some articles considered the fractions with DP lower than 10 as short-chained fructo-oligosaccharides, and only called the longer-chained molecules inulin.

Because of the β(2,1) linkages, inulin is not digested by enzymes in the human alimentary system, contributing to its functional properties: dietary fiber, prebiotic, and reduced calorie value effects. Without color and odor, it has little impact on sensory characteristics of food products. Oligofructose has 30 to 50% of the sweetness of sucrose, and its sweetening profile is similar to sugar. Standard inulin is slightly sweet, while high-performance inulin is not. Its solubility is higher than the classical fibers. When thoroughly mixed with liquid, inulin forms a gel and a white creamy structure that is similar to fat. Its three-dimensional gel network, consisting of insoluble submicron crystalline inulin particles, immobilizes a large amount of water, assuring its physical stability. It can also improve the stability of foams and emulsions.

== Uses ==
=== Harvesting and extraction ===
Chicory root is the main source of extraction for commercial production of inulin. The extraction process for inulin is similar to obtaining sugar from sugar beets. After harvest, the chicory roots are sliced and washed, then soaked in a solvent (hot water or ethanol); the inulin is then isolated, purified, and spray dried. Inulin may also be synthesized from sucrose.

=== Processed foods ===
Inulin received no-objection status as generally recognized as safe (GRAS) from the U.S. Food and Drug Administration (FDA), including long-chain inulin as GRAS. In the early 21st century, the use of inulin in processed foods was due in part to its adaptable characteristics for manufacturing. It is approved by the FDA as an ingredient to enhance the dietary fiber value of manufactured foods. Its flavor ranges from bland to subtly sweet (about 10% of the sweetness of sugar/sucrose). It can be used to replace sugar, fat, and flour. This is advantageous because inulin contains 25–35% of the food energy of carbohydrates (starch, sugar).

In addition to being a versatile ingredient, inulin provides nutritional advantages by increasing calcium absorption and possibly magnesium absorption, while promoting the growth of intestinal bacteria. Chicory inulin is reported to increase absorption of calcium in young women and young men.

=== As a prebiotic ===
In nutrition, inulin is considered a form of soluble fiber and is categorized as a prebiotic. It is under preliminary research for its potential causative effects on various gastrointestinal mechanisms, such as promoting the functions of intestinal bacteria, laxation, insulin resistance, lipid profiles, absorption of calcium and magnesium, and satiety.

It is also considered a FODMAP, a class of carbohydrates which are rapidly fermented in the colon producing gas. Although FODMAPs may cause certain digestive discomfort in some people, they produce potentially favorable alterations in the intestinal flora that contribute to maintaining health of the colon.

Due to the body's limited ability to process fructans, inulin has minimal increasing impact on blood sugar, and may potentially have use in managing blood sugar-related illnesses, such as metabolic syndrome.

=== Medical ===
Inulin and its analog sinistrin are used to help measure kidney function by determining the glomerular filtration rate (GFR), which is the volume of fluid filtered from the renal (kidney) glomerular capillaries into the Bowman's capsule per unit time.

While inulin is the gold standard for measuring the GFR, it is rarely used in practice due to the expense and difficulty in conducting the test; it requires intravenous (IV) access for the infusion of inulin as well as up to twelve blood samples taken from the patient over the course of four hours. To determine the glomerular filtration rate in humans, a large initial dose of inulin is injected, which is followed by a constant infusion of inulin at a rate which compensates for its loss in the urine, thus maintaining a reasonably constant level in the plasma. In the United States, creatinine clearance is more widely used to estimate GFR.

A 2017 systematic review of low-to-moderate quality clinical trial research showed that dietary supplementation with inulin-type fructans reduced blood levels of low-density cholesterol, a biomarker of cardiovascular disease.

=== Possible side effects ===
In doses of 15–50 grams per day, dietary inulin increases the frequency of defecation. Possible side effects of regularly using inulin in the diet include gastrointestinal discomfort, bloating, flatulence, diarrhea, and stomach inflammation in people with allergies to inulin.

=== Industrial use ===
Nonhydrolyzed inulin can also be directly converted to ethanol in a simultaneous saccharification and fermentation process, which may have potential for converting crops high in inulin into ethanol for fuel.

== Biochemistry ==
Inulins are polymers composed mainly of fructose units (fructans), and typically have a terminal glucose. The fructose units in inulins are joined by a β(2→1) glycosidic bond. The molecule is almost exclusively linear, with only a few percent branching. In general, plant inulins contain between 2 and 70 fructose units or sometimes as high as 200, but molecules with less than 10 units are called fructo-oligosaccharides, the simplest being 1-kestose, which has two fructose units and one glucose unit. Bacterial inulin is more highly branched (more than 15% branching) and contains on the order of tens or hundreds of subunits.

Inulins are named in the following manner, where n is the number of fructose residues and py is the abbreviation for pyranosyl:

- Inulins with a terminal glucose are known as alpha-D-glucopyranosyl-[beta-D-fructofuranosyl](n-1)-D-fructofuranosides, abbreviated as GpyFn.
- Inulins without glucose are beta-D-fructopyranosyl-[D-fructofuranosyl](n-1)-D-fructofuranosides, abbreviated as FpyFn.

Hydrolysis of inulins may yield fructo-oligosaccharides, which are oligomers with a degree of polymerization (DP) of 10 or less.

== Calculation of glomerular filtration rate ==
Inulin is uniquely treated by nephrons in that it is completely filtered at the glomerulus but neither secreted nor reabsorbed by the tubules. This property of inulin allows the clearance of inulin to be used clinically as a highly accurate measure of glomerular filtration rate (GFR) — the rate of plasma from the afferent arteriole that is filtered into Bowman's capsule measured in ml/min.

It is informative to contrast the properties of inulin with those of para-aminohippuric acid (PAH). PAH is partially filtered from plasma at the glomerulus and not reabsorbed by the tubules, in a manner identical to inulin. PAH is different from inulin in that the fraction of PAH that bypasses the glomerulus and enters the nephron's tubular cells (via the peritubular capillaries) is completely secreted. Renal clearance of PAH is thus useful in calculation of renal plasma flow (RPF), which empirically is (1-hematocrit) times renal blood flow. Of note, the clearance of PAH is reflective only of RPF to portions of the kidney that deal with urine formation, and, thus, underestimates the actual RPF by about 10%.

The measurement of GFR by inulin or sinistrin is still considered the gold standard. However, it has now been largely replaced by other, simpler measures that are approximations of GFR. These measures, which involve clearance of such substrates as EDTA, iohexol, cystatin C, ^{125}I-iothalamate (sodium radioiothalamate), the chromium radioisotope ^{51}Cr (chelated with EDTA), and creatinine, have had their utility confirmed in large cohorts of patients with chronic kidney disease.

For both inulin and creatinine, the calculations involve concentrations in the urine and in the serum. However, unlike creatinine, inulin is not naturally present in the body. This is an advantage of inulin (because the amount infused will be known) and a disadvantage (because an infusion is necessary).

== Metabolism in vivo ==
Inulin is indigestible by the human enzymes ptyalin and amylase which are adapted to digest starch and as a result, it passes through much of the digestive system intact. Only in the colon do bacteria metabolise inulin with the release of significant quantities of carbon dioxide, hydrogen, and/or methane.

Inulin is a soluble fiber, one of three types of dietary fiber including soluble, insoluble and resistant starch. Soluble fiber dissolves in water to form a gelatinous material. Some soluble fibers may help lower blood cholesterol and glucose levels.

Because normal digestion does not break inulin down into monosaccharides, it does not elevate blood sugar levels and may therefore be helpful in the management of diabetes. Inulin also stimulates the growth of bacteria in the gut. Inulin passes through the stomach and duodenum undigested and is highly available to the gut bacterial flora. This makes it similar to resistant starches and other fermentable carbohydrates.

Some traditional diets contain more than 20g per day of inulin or fructo-oligosaccharides. The diet of the prehistoric hunter-forager in the Chihuahuan Desert has been estimated to include 135 g per day of inulin-type fructans. Many foods naturally high in inulin or fructo-oligosaccharides such as chicory, garlic, and leek have been seen as "stimulants of good health" for centuries.

As of 2013, no regulatory authority had permitted health claims in the marketing of prebiotics as a class. Inulin's health effects had been studied in small clinical trials which showed that it causes gastrointestinal adverse effects such as bloating and flatulence and it does not affect triglyceride levels or development of fatty liver. It may also help to prevent travelers' diarrhea and may help increase calcium absorption in adolescents.

== Natural sources ==
Foods that contain inulin:

- Chicory root (up to 18g per 100g)
- Jerusalem artichoke (up to 13g per 100g)
- Globe artichoke
- Dandelion greens (13.5 grams per 100g)
- Garlic (up to 12.5g per 100g)
- Leeks (6.5g per 100g)
- Onions (4.3g per 100g)
- Asparagus (2.5g per 100g)
- Wheat bran (2.5g per 100g)
- Barley (0.8g per 100g)
- Bananas (0.5g per 100g)
