= Urine flow rate =

Test measuring urine flow during urination

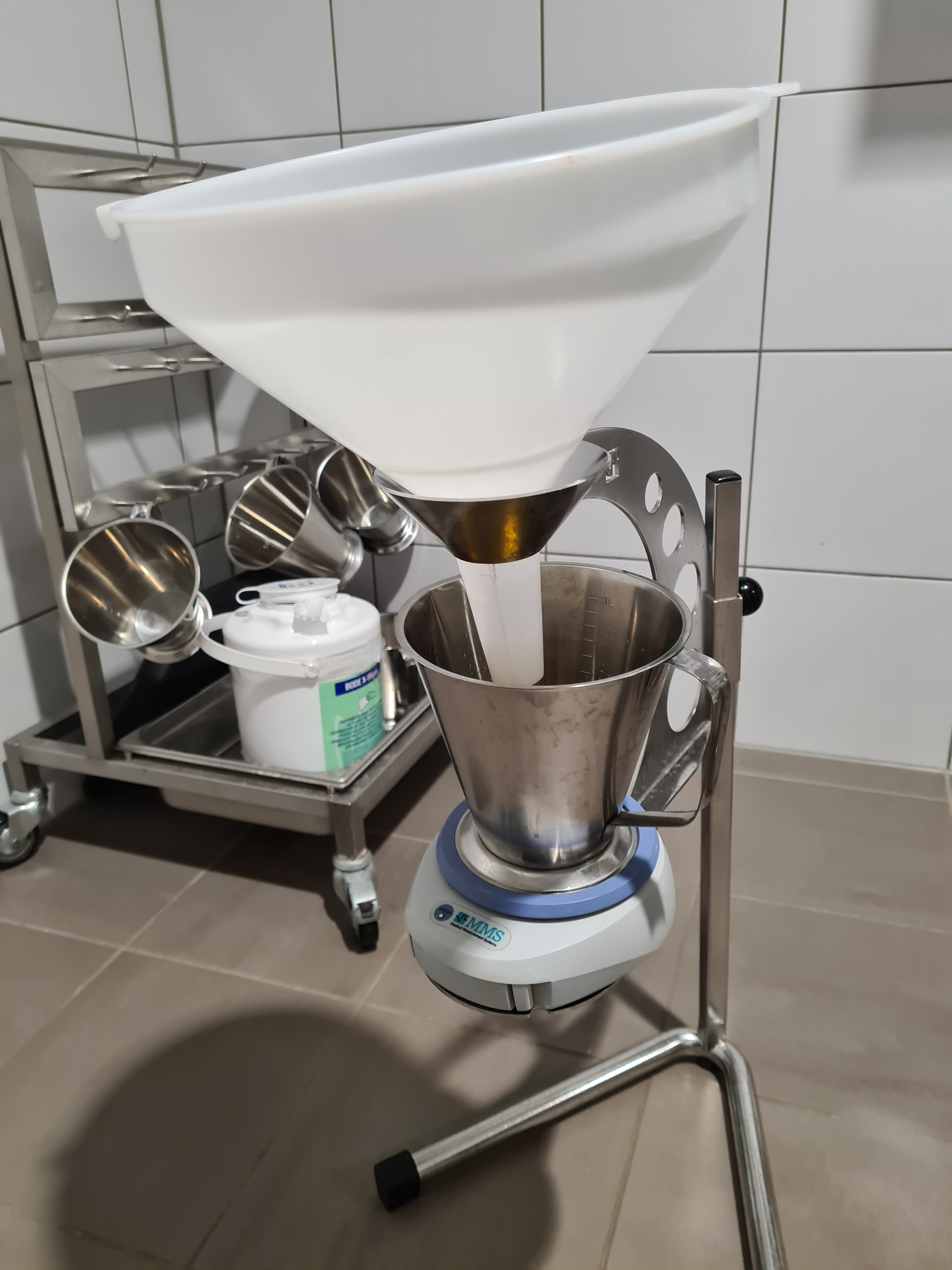
A uroflometer for measuring urine flow.

Urine flow rate or urinary flow rate is the volumetric flow rate of urine during urination. It is a measure of the quantity of urine excreted in a specified period of time (per second or per minute). It is measured with uroflowmetry, a type of flow measurement.

The letters "V" (for volume) and "Q" (a conventional symbol for flow rate) are both used as a symbol for urine flow rate. The V often has a dot (overdot), that is, V̇ ("V-dot"). Q_{max} indicates the maximum flow rate. Q_{max} is used as an indicator for the diagnosis of enlarged prostate. A lower Q_{max} may indicate that the enlarged prostate puts pressure on the urethra, partially occluding it.

Uroflowmetry is performed by urinating into a special urinal, toilet, or disposable device that has a measuring device built in. The average rate changes with age. Teenage boys and younger men tend to have the fastest urine flow rates.

== Clinical usage ==
Changes in the urine flow rate can be indicative of kidney, prostate or other renal disorders. Similarly, by measuring urine flow rate, it is possible to calculate the clearance of metabolites that are used as clinical markers for disease.

The urinary flow rate in males with benign prostate hyperplasia is influenced, although not statistically by voiding position. In a meta-analysis on the influence of voiding position in males on urodynamics, males with this condition showed an improvement of 1.23 ml/s in the sitting position. Healthy, young males were not influenced by changing voiding position.

== See also ==
- Urodynamics
