= Creatinine =

Breakdown product of creatine phosphate

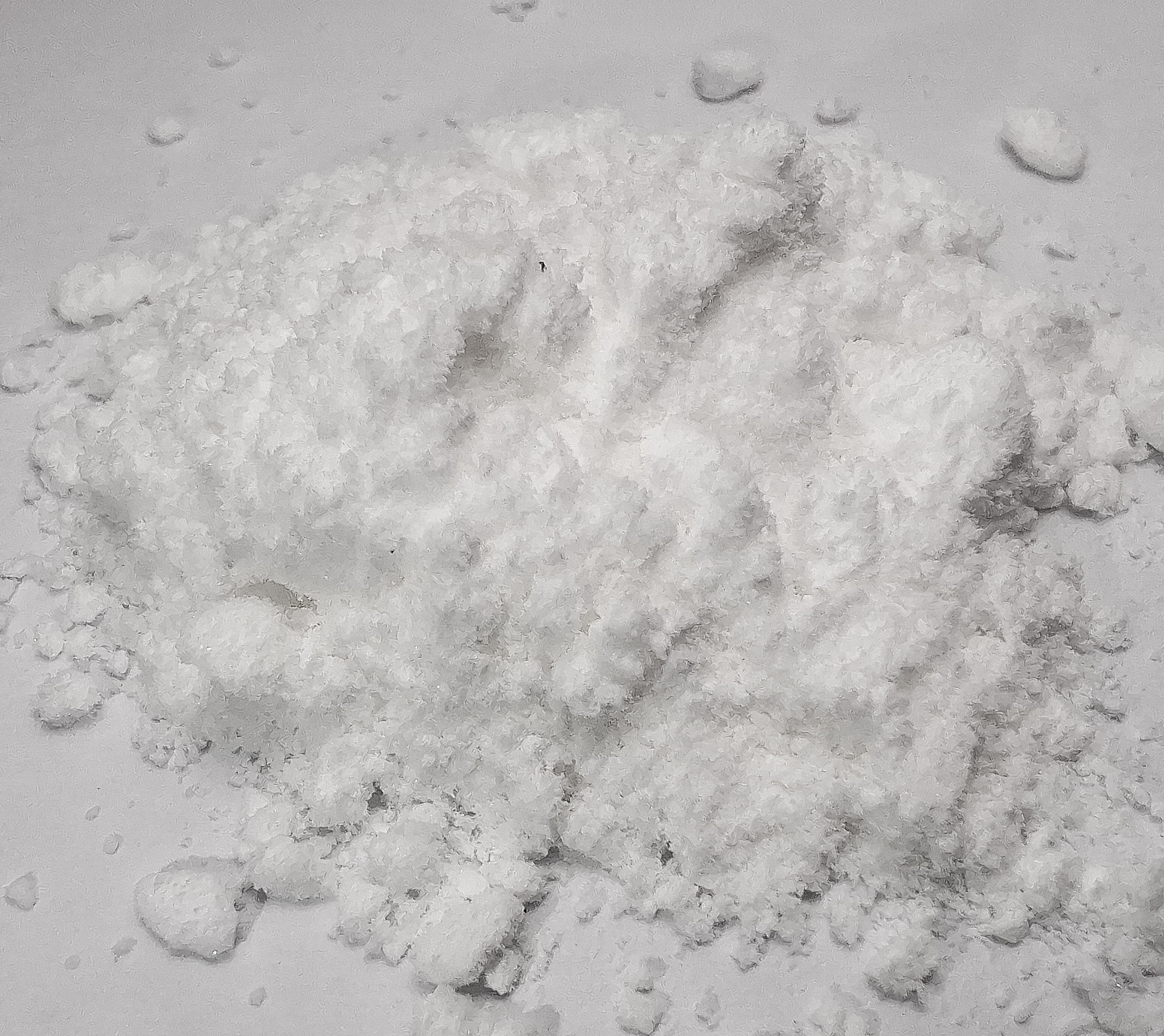
- Creatinine Powder

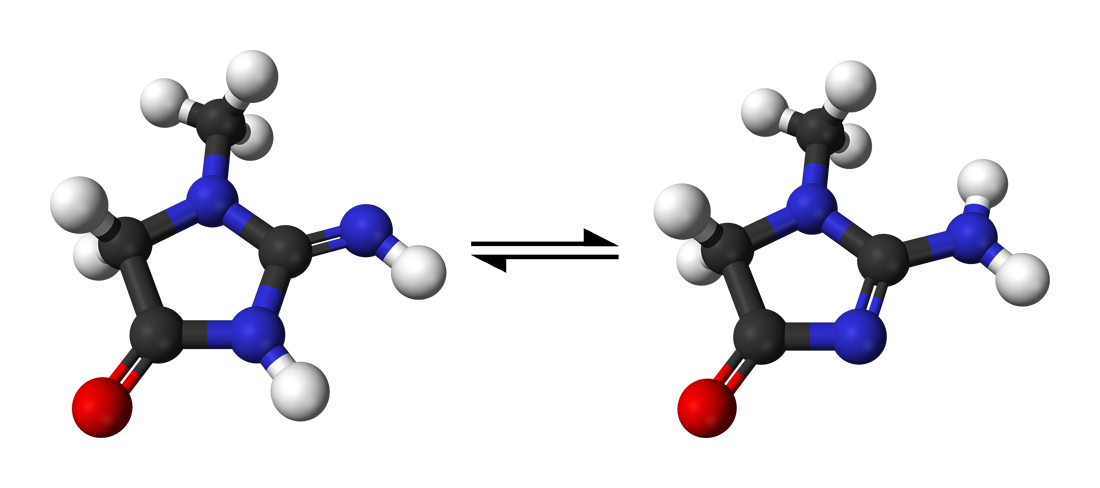

Names
- Preferred IUPAC name 2-Amino-1-methyl-5H-imidazol-4-one
- Other names 2-Amino-1-methylimidazol-4-ol

Identifiers
CAS Number	60-27-5
3D model (JSmol)	Interactive image; Interactive image
Beilstein Reference	112061
ChEBI	CHEBI:16737
ChEMBL	ChEMBL65567
ChemSpider	21640982
DrugBank	DB11846
ECHA InfoCard	100.000.424
EC Number	200-466-7
KEGG	D03600
MeSH	Creatinine
PubChem CID	26009888; 588 minor tautomer
UNII	AYI8EX34EU
CompTox Dashboard (EPA)	DTXSID8045987
- InChI: InChI=1S/C4H7N3O/c1-7-2-3(8)6-4(7)5/h2,8H,1H3,(H2,5,6) Key: BTXYOFGSUFEOLA-UHFFFAOYSA-N; InChI=1/C4H7N3O/c1-7-2-3(8)6-4(7)5/h2H2,1H3,(H2,5,6,8) Key: DDRJAANPRJIHGJ-UHFFFAOYAV
- SMILES: CN1CC(=O)N=C1N; CN1CC(=O)NC1=N

Properties
Chemical formula	C_{4}H_{7}N_{3}O
Molar mass	113.120 g·mol^{−1}
Appearance	White crystals
Density	1.09 g cm^{−3}
Melting point	300 °C (572 °F; 573 K) (decomposes)
Solubility in water	1 part per 12 90 g/L at 20°C
log P	−1.76
Acidity (pK_{a})	12.309
Basicity (pK_{b})	1.688
Isoelectric point	11.19

Thermochemistry
Heat capacity (C)	138.1 J K^{−1} mol^{−1} (at 23.4 °C)
Std molar entropy (S^{⦵}_{298})	167.4 J K^{−1} mol^{−1}
Std enthalpy of formation (Δ_{f}H^{⦵}_{298})	−240.81–239.05 kJ mol^{−1}
Std enthalpy of combustion (Δ_{c}H^{⦵}_{298})	−2.33539–2.33367 MJ mol^{−1}

Hazards
NFPA 704 (fire diamond)	1 1 0
Flash point	290 °C (554 °F; 563 K)
- Except where otherwise noted, data are given for materials in their standard state (at 25 °C [77 °F], 100 kPa). verify (what is ?) Infobox references

Creatinine (/kriˈætɪnɪn, -ˌniːn/; from Ancient Greek κρέας (kréas) 'flesh') is a breakdown product of creatine phosphate from muscle and protein metabolism. It is released at a constant rate by the body (depending on muscle mass).

== Biological relevance ==
Serum creatinine (a blood measurement) is an important indicator of kidney function, because it is an easily measured byproduct of muscle metabolism that is excreted unchanged by the kidneys. Creatinine itself is produced via a biological system involving creatine, phosphocreatine (also known as creatine phosphate), and adenosine triphosphate (ATP, the body's immediate energy supply).

Creatine is synthesized primarily in the liver by methylation of glycocyamine (guanidino acetate, synthesized in the kidney from the amino acids arginine and glycine) by S-adenosyl methionine. It is then transported in the blood to other organs, muscles, and the brain, where it is phosphorylated to phosphocreatine, a high-energy compound. Creatine conversion to phosphocreatine is catalysed by creatine kinase; spontaneous formation of creatinine occurs during the reaction.

Creatinine is removed from the blood chiefly by the kidneys, primarily by glomerular filtration, but also by proximal tubular secretion. Little or no tubular reabsorption of creatinine occurs. If filtration in the kidney is deficient, blood creatinine concentrations rise. Therefore, creatinine concentrations in blood and urine may be used to calculate the creatinine clearance (CrCl), which correlates approximately with the glomerular filtration rate (GFR). Blood creatinine concentrations may also be used alone to estimate the GFR (eGFR).

The GFR is clinically important as a measurement of kidney function. However, in cases of severe kidney dysfunction the CrCl rate will overestimate the GFR, because hypersecretion of creatinine by the proximal renal tubules will account for a larger fraction of the total creatinine cleared. Ketoacids, cimetidine, and trimethoprim reduce creatinine tubular secretion and therefore increase the accuracy of the GFR estimate, in particular in severe kidney dysfunction. (In the absence of secretion, creatinine behaves like inulin.)

An alternative estimation of kidney function can be made when interpreting the blood plasma concentration of creatinine along with that of urea. BUN-to-creatinine ratio (the ratio of blood urea nitrogen to creatinine) can indicate other problems besides those intrinsic to the kidney; for example, a urea concentration raised out of proportion to the creatinine may indicate a prerenal problem, such as volume depletion.

Counterintuitively, supporting the observation of higher creatinine production in women than in men, and putting into question the algorithms for GFR that do not distinguish for sex, women have higher muscle protein synthesis and higher muscle protein turnover across their life span. As HDL supports muscle anabolism, higher muscle protein turnover links increased creatine to the generally higher serum HDL in women compared with serum HDL in men.

=== Antibacterial and potential immunosuppressive properties ===
Studies suggest that creatinine can be effective in killing bacteria of many species, both Gram positive and Gram negative, as well as diverse antibiotic-resistant bacterial strains. Creatinine appears not to affect the growth of fungi and yeasts; this can be used to isolate slower growing fungi free from the normal bacterial populations found in most environmental samples. The mechanism by which creatinine kills bacteria is unknown. Some reports also suggest that creatinine may have immunosuppressive properties.

== Diagnostic use ==
Serum creatinine is the most commonly used indicator (although not a direct measure) of renal function. A raised creatinine is not always representative of a true reduction in GFR. A high reading may be due to: increased production of creatinine (with no association to reduced kidney function), interference with the assay, or reduced tubular secretion of creatinine. An increase in serum creatinine can be due to increased ingestion of cooked meat (which contains creatinine converted from creatine by the heat from cooking) or excessive intake of protein and creatine supplements, taken to enhance athletic performance. Intense exercise can increase creatinine by increasing muscle breakdown.

Hypovolaemia of any cause, may have an associated increase in creatinine concentration, secondary to the expected reduction in GFR. This is pre-renal impairment of kidney function. Several medications and chromogens can interfere with the chemical assay. Creatinine secretion by the renal tubules can be blocked by some medications, again increasing measured creatinine.

=== Serum creatinine ===
Diagnostic serum creatinine studies are used to determine renal function. The reference interval is 0.6–1.3 mg/dL (53–115 μmol/L). It is simple to measure serum creatinine, and it is the most commonly used indicator of renal function.

A rise in blood creatinine concentration is a late marker, observed only with marked damage to functioning nephrons. The test is therefore unsuitable for detecting early-stage kidney disease. A better estimate of kidney function is given by calculating the estimated glomerular filtration rate (eGFR). eGFR can be calculated without a 24-hour urine collection, using serum creatinine concentration and some or all of the following variables: sex, age, and weight, as suggested by the American Diabetes Association. Many laboratories will automatically calculate eGFR when a creatinine test is requested. Algorithms to estimate GFR from creatinine concentration and other parameters are discussed in the renal function article. Unfortunately, the MDRD Study equation was developed in people with chronic kidney disease, and its major limitations are imprecision and systematic underestimation of measured GFR (bias) at higher/normal values.

A concern as of late 2010 relates to the adoption of a new analytical method, and the possible effect this may have in clinical medicine. Most clinical laboratories now align their creatinine measurements against a new standardized isotope dilution mass spectrometry (IDMS) method to measure serum creatinine. IDMS appears to give lower values than older methods when the serum creatinine values are relatively low, for example 0.7 mg/dL. The IDMS method would result in comparative overestimation of the corresponding calculated GFR in some patients with normal renal function. A few medicines are dosed even in normal renal function using that derived value of GFR. The dose, unless further modified, could then be higher than desired, potentially causing increased drug-related toxicity. To counter the effect of changing to IDMS, new FDA guidelines have suggested limiting doses of carboplatin, a chemotherapy drug, to specified maxima.

=== Urine creatinine ===
Males produce approximately 150 μmol to 200 μmol of creatinine per kilogram of body weight per 24 h, while females produce approximately 100 μmol to 150 μmol/kg/24 h. In normal circumstances, all the creatinine produced is excreted in the urine.

Creatinine concentration is checked during standard urine drug tests. An expected creatinine concentration indicates that the test sample is undiluted, whereas low amounts of creatinine in the urine indicate either a manipulated test or low initial baseline creatinine concentrations. Test samples considered manipulated due to low creatinine are not tested, and the test is sometimes considered failed.

== Interpretation ==
In the United States and in most European countries creatinine is usually reported in mg/dL, whereas in Canada, Australia, and a few European countries, such as the UK, μmol/L is the usual unit. One mg/dL of creatinine equals 88.4 μmol/L.

The typical human reference ranges for serum creatinine are 0.5 mg/dL to 1.0 mg/dL (about 45 μmol/L to 90 μmol/L) for women and 0.7 mg/dL to 1.2 mg/dL (60 μmol/L to 110 μmol/L) for men. The significance of a single creatinine value must be interpreted in light of the patient's muscle mass. Patients with greater muscle mass have higher creatinine concentrations.

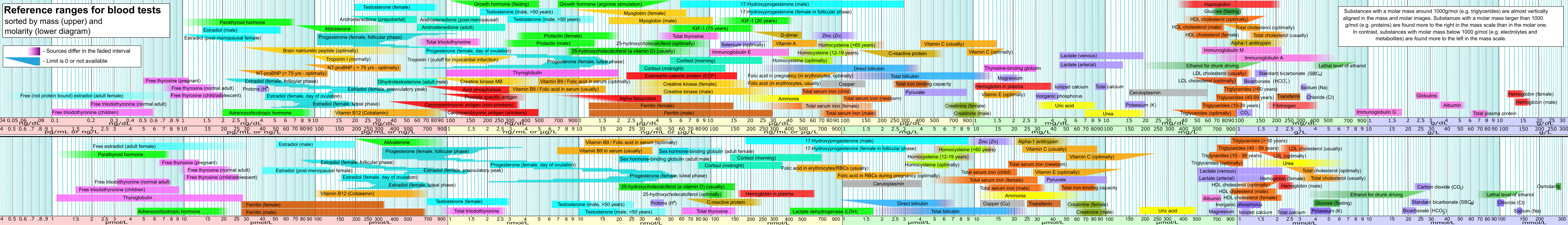
Reference ranges for blood tests, comparing blood content of creatinine (shown in apple green) with other constituents

The trend of serum creatinine concentrations over time is more important than the absolute creatinine concentration.

Serum creatinine concentrations may increase when an ACE inhibitor (ACEI) is taken for heart failure and chronic kidney disease. ACE inhibitors provide survival benefits for patients with heart failure and slow disease progression in patients with chronic kidney disease. An increase not exceeding 30% is to be expected with use of an ACE inhibitor. Therefore, an ACE inhibitor should not be withdrawn when the serum creatinine increases, unless the increase exceeds 30% or hyperkalemia develops.

== Chemistry ==
In chemical terms, creatinine is a lactam and an imidazolidinone

In the laboratory it can be produced from the cyclization of creatine using hydrochloric acid

C_{4}H_{9}N_{3}O_{2} + HCl → C_{4}H_{7}N_{3}O·HCl + H_{2}O

This produces creatinine hydrochloride.

Several tautomers of creatinine exist; ordered by contribution, they are:

- 2-Amino-1-methyl-1H-imidazol-4-ol (or 2-amino-1-methylimidazol-4-ol)
- 2-Amino-1-methyl-4,5-dihydro-1H-imidazol-4-one
- 2-Imino-1-methyl-2,3-dihydro-1H-imidazol-4-ol (or 2-imino-1-methyl-3H-imidazol-4-ol)
- 2-Imino-1-methylimidazolidin-4-one
- 2-Imino-1-methyl-2,5-dihydro-1H-imidazol-4-ol (or 2-imino-1-methyl-5H-imidazol-4-ol)

Creatinine starts to decompose at around 300 °C.

== See also ==
- Cystatin C, a novel marker of kidney function
- Jaffe reaction, an example of a method of assaying creatinine
- Rhabdomyolysis, which may be diagnosed using serum creatinine concentrations
- Nephrotic syndrome
