= FMO2 =

Protein found in humans

Identifiers
- Aliases: FMO2, FMO1B1, flavin containing monooxygenase 2, flavin containing dimethylaniline monoxygenase 2
- External IDs: OMIM: 603955; MGI: 1916776; GeneCards: FMO2

Gene location (Human)
Chr.	Chromosome 1 (human)
Band	1q24.3	Start	171,185,249 bp
Band	1q24.3	End	171,212,686 bp

Gene location (Mouse)
Chr.	Chromosome 1 (mouse)
Band	1|1 H2.1	Start	162,701,886 bp
Band	1|1 H2.1	End	162,726,295 bp
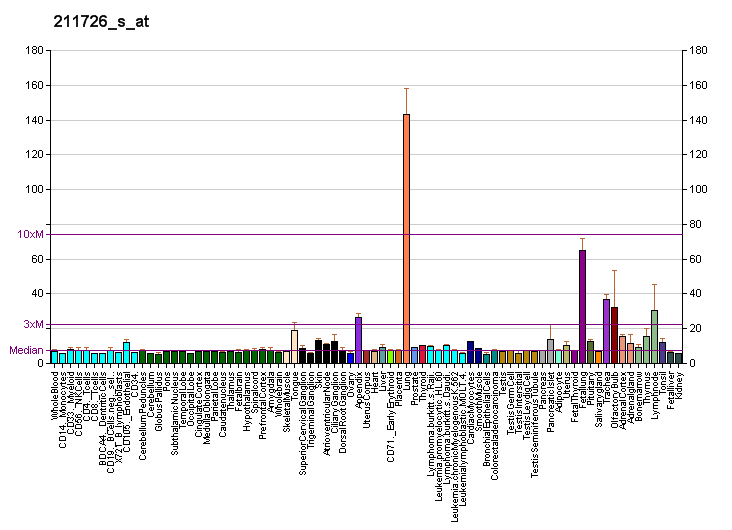
RNA expression pattern
Bgee	Human / Mouse (ortholog); Top expressed in: pericardium; right lung; lower lobe of lung; Descending thoracic aorta; lactiferous duct; ascending aorta; vena cava; upper lobe of lung; upper lobe of left lung; abdominal fat / Top expressed in: lumbar spinal ganglion; ascending aorta; right lung; left lung lobe; aortic valve; right lung lobe; pericardium; esophagus; right kidney; human kidney; More reference expression data
BioGPS	More reference expression data
Gene ontology
Molecular function	oxidoreductase activity; N,N-dimethylaniline monooxygenase activity; NADP binding; flavin adenine dinucleotide binding; monooxygenase activity
Cellular component	organelle membrane; endoplasmic reticulum membrane; membrane; endoplasmic reticulum; intracellular membrane-bounded organelle
Biological process	xenobiotic metabolic process; toxin metabolic process; NADPH oxidation; NADP metabolic process; oxygen metabolic process; organic acid metabolic process
Sources:Amigo / QuickGO
Orthologs
Databases	NCBI: entry; OMA: entry
Species	Human	Mouse
Entrez	2327	55990
Ensembl	ENSG00000094963	ENSMUSG00000040170
UniProt	Q99518	Q8K2I3
RefSeq (mRNA)	NM_001301347; NM_001460; NM_001365900	NM_018881; NM_001360913; NM_001360914
RefSeq (protein)	NP_001288276; NP_001451; NP_001352829	NP_061369; NP_001347842; NP_001347843
Location (UCSC)	Chr 1: 171.19 – 171.21 Mb	Chr 1: 162.7 – 162.73 Mb
PubMed search
- Wikidata
View/Edit Human	View/Edit Mouse

Flavin-containing monooxygenase 2 (FMO2), also known as dimethylaniline monooxygenase [N-oxide-forming] 2, is a mammalian enzyme that in humans is encoded by the FMO2 gene. The gene is found in a cluster with the FMO1, FMO3, and FMO4 genes on chromosome 1.

FMO2 is a member of the family of flavin-containing monooxygenases, NADPH-dependent enzymes that catalyze the oxidation of many drugs and xenobiotics. It catalyzes the N-oxidation of some primary alkylamines through an N-hydroxylamine intermediate.

In humans, FMO2 is expressed in lung tissue. The most common isoform, FMO2*2A, contains a premature stop codon, leading to a truncated protein with no catalytic activity that is probably rapidly degraded. The other isoform, FMO2*1, present in sub-Saharan Africans (up to 50%), African-Americans (26%) and Hispanics (2–7%), is functional. Its substrates include thioether-containing pesticides, the anti-tuberculosis drug ethionamide, as well as α-naphthylthiourea and other thioureas.
