= 4-nitrophenol 2-monooxygenase =

Class of enzymes

Identifiers
- EC no.: 1.14.13.29
- CAS no.: 91116-87-9

Databases
- BRENDA: enzyme data
- ExPASy: NiceZyme view
- KEGG: enzyme entry
- MetaCyc: metabolic pathway
- Rhea: reactions
- PDB structures: RCSB PDB PDBe PDBsum
- Gene Ontology: AmiGO / QuickGO
Search
- PMC: articles
- PubMed: articles
- NCBI: proteins

4-nitrophenol 2-monooxygenase (EC 1.14.13.29) is an enzyme that catalyzes the chemical reaction

4-Nitrophenol
+ NADH + H^{+}
O_{2}
H_{2}O
4-Nitrocatechol
+ NAD^{+}

The four substrates of this enzyme are 4-nitrophenol, reduced nicotinamide adenine dinucleotide (NADH), oxygen. and a proton. Its products are 4-nitrocatechol, oxidised NAD^{+}, and water.

The enzyme is a flavin-containing monooxygenase that uses molecular oxygen as oxidant and incorporates one of its atoms into the starting material. The systematic name of this enzyme class is 4-nitrophenol,NADH:oxygen oxidoreductase (2-hydroxylating). Other names in common use include 4-nitrophenol hydroxylase, and 4-nitrophenol-2-hydroxylase.
