= José Penna =

Argentine physician and infectious disease expert (1855-1919)

José Penna (April 5, 1855 - March 29, 1919) was an Argentine physician and infectious disease expert. He is notable for being one of the most important Latin American hygienists of his era.

== Early years ==
Born in Bahía Blanca, Penna was the son of Colonel Juan Penna, an Italian officer.

Penna worked a blacksmith while he was in high school, before attending m focal school at the University of Buenos Aires in 1873. He was forced to temporarily halt his studies due to the Revolution of 1874, enlisting as a second lieutenant in the national guard. He returned to school, graduating in 1879 and published his thesis on uremia—he was the first to publish on experimental medicine in Argentina.

== Career ==
In 1882, he was appointed as deputy directory of the house of isolation, where he later become director and remained for 30 years.

In 1884, he was appointed to the Argentinian National Academy of Medicine, where he would later serve as vice president and then later president.

He went into the field of infectious diseases and played a central role in fighting the South American cholera epidemics of 1886 and 1887, as well as that of yellow fever in 1871. He was instrumental in reorganizing the National Department of Hygiene, enacting measures against malaria that helped lead to its eradication in the country in 1949.

Along with Emilio Coni, Penna founded the Argentine Medial Association.

He became the president of the Argentine National Department of Hygiene in 1911 and president of the Faculty of Medicine in 1916-17.

== Author ==
In 1893, Penna published The Role of Epidemics in the Depopulation of America, although most consider Sanitary Administration and Public Assistance in Buenos Aires to be his most important work, published in 1910.

== Death ==
Following his death in 1919, Penna was cremated and the event was given much coverage in the newspapers; he became even more of an inspiration to the cremationists following his death.
