= FMO4 =

Protein-coding gene in humans

Identifiers
- Aliases: FMO4, FMO2, flavin containing monooxygenase 4, flavin containing dimethylaniline monoxygenase 4
- External IDs: OMIM: 136131; MGI: 2429497; GeneCards: FMO4
Enzyme activity
EC #	BRENDA	ExPASy	KEGG	MetaCyc
1.14.13.8	↗	↗	↗	↗

Gene location (Human)
Chr.	Chromosome 1 (human)
Band	1q24.3	Start	171,314,183 bp
Band	1q24.3	End	171,342,084 bp

Gene location (Mouse)
Chr.	Chromosome 1 (mouse)
Band	1 H2.1|1 70.34 cM	Start	162,620,757 bp
Band	1 H2.1|1 70.34 cM	End	162,641,541 bp
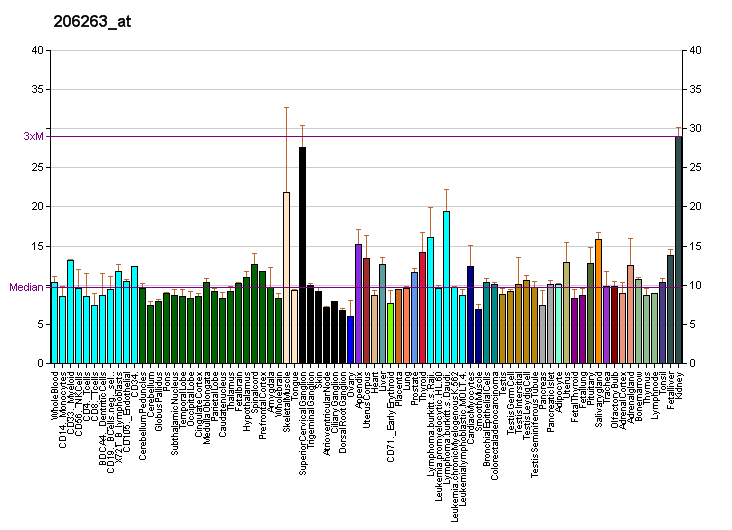
RNA expression pattern
Bgee	Human / Mouse (ortholog); Top expressed in: kidney tubule; right lobe of liver; mucosa of ileum; gonad; human kidney; testicle; glomerulus; metanephric glomerulus; ascending aorta; Descending thoracic aorta / Top expressed in: right kidney; yolk sac; jejunum; proximal tubule; zygote; duodenum; embryo; ileum; secondary oocyte; human kidney; More reference expression data
BioGPS	More reference expression data
Orthologs
Databases	NCBI: entry; OMA: entry
Species	Human	Mouse
Entrez	2329	226564
Ensembl	ENSG00000076258	ENSMUSG00000026692
UniProt	P31512	Q8VHG0
RefSeq (mRNA)	NM_002022	NM_144878
RefSeq (protein)	NP_002013	NP_659127
Location (UCSC)	Chr 1: 171.31 – 171.34 Mb	Chr 1: 162.62 – 162.64 Mb
PubMed search
- Wikidata
View/Edit Human	View/Edit Mouse

Dimethylaniline monooxygenase [N-oxide-forming] 4 is an enzyme in humans encoded by the FMO4 gene.

== Function ==
Metabolic N-oxidation of the diet-derived amino-trimethylamine (TMA) is mediated by flavin-containing monooxygenase and is subject to an inherited FMO3 polymorphism in man resulting in a small subpopulation with reduced TMA N-oxidation capacity resulting in fish odor syndrome Trimethylaminuria. Three forms of the enzyme, FMO1 found in fetal liver, FMO2 found in adult liver, and FMO3 are encoded by genes clustered in the 1q23-q25 region. Flavin-containing monooxygenases are NADPH-dependent flavoenzymes that catalyzes the oxidation of soft nucleophilic heteroatom centers in drugs, pesticides, and xenobiotics.

== Cancer ==
FMO4 gene has been observed progressively downregulated in Human papillomavirus-positive neoplastic keratinocytes derived from uterine cervical preneoplastic lesions at different levels of malignancy. For this reason, FMO4 is likely to be associated with tumorigenesis and may be a potential prognostic marker for uterine cervical preneoplastic lesions progression.
