= L-lysine 6-monooxygenase (NADPH) =

Class of enzymes

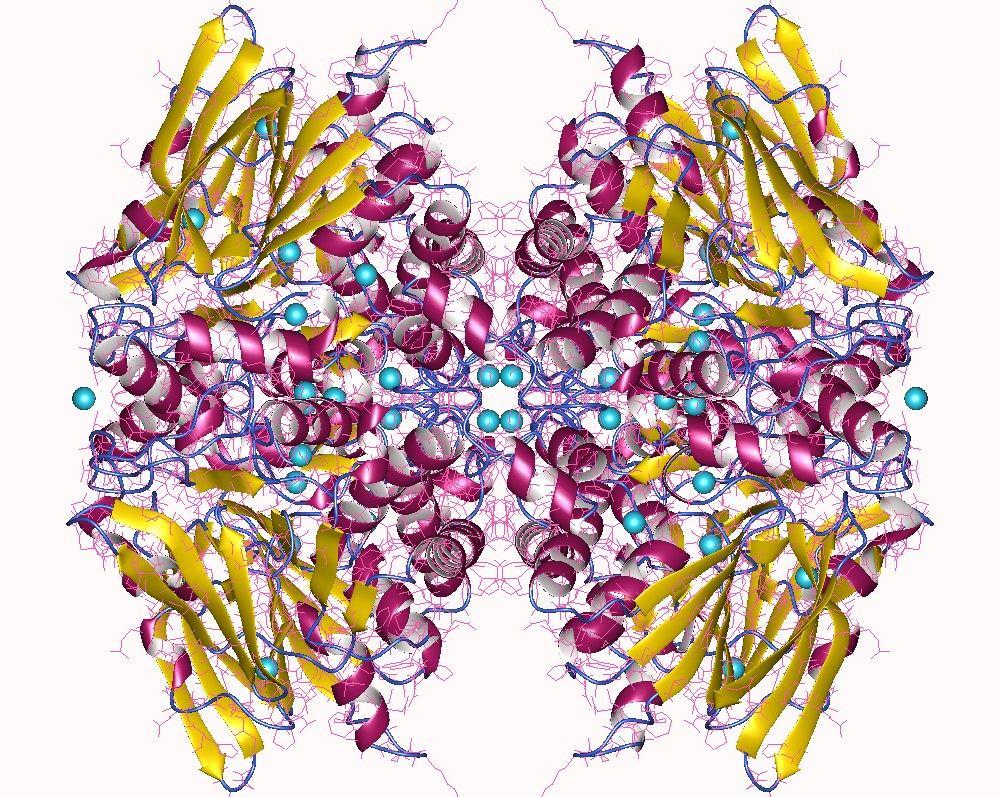
- L-lysine 6-monooxygenase tetramer + 44 I (l.blue), Pseudomonas syringae

Identifiers
- EC no.: 1.14.13.59
- CAS no.: 64295-82-5

Databases
- IntEnz: IntEnz view
- BRENDA: BRENDA entry
- ExPASy: NiceZyme view
- KEGG: KEGG entry
- MetaCyc: metabolic pathway
- PRIAM: profile
- PDB structures: RCSB PDB PDBe PDBsum
- Gene Ontology: AmiGO / QuickGO
Search
- PMC: articles
- PubMed: articles
- NCBI: proteins

L-lysine 6-monooxygenase (NADPH) (EC 1.14.13.59) is an enzyme that catalyzes the chemical reaction

L-lysine
+ NADPH + H^{+}
O_{2}
H_{2}O
N(6)-hydroxy-L-lysine
+ NADP^{+}

The four substrates of this enzyme are L-lysine, reduced nicotinamide adenine dinucleotide phosphate (NADPH), oxygen, and a proton. Its products are N(6)-hydroxy-L-lysine, oxidised NADP^{+}, and water.

The enzyme is a flavin-containing monooxygenase that uses molecular oxygen as oxidant and incorporates one of its atoms into the starting material. The systematic name of this enzyme class is L-lysine,NADPH:oxygen oxidoreductase (6-hydroxylating). It is also called lysine N6-hydroxylase. It participates in siderophore biosynthesis and uses flavin adenine dinucleotide as a cofactor.
