= Melilotate 3-monooxygenase =

Class of enzymes

Identifiers
- EC no.: 1.14.13.4
- CAS no.: 37256-72-7

Databases
- BRENDA: enzyme data
- ExPASy: NiceZyme view
- KEGG: enzyme entry
- MetaCyc: metabolic pathway
- Rhea: reactions
- PDB structures: RCSB PDB PDBe PDBsum
- Gene Ontology: AmiGO / QuickGO
Search
- PMC: articles
- PubMed: articles
- NCBI: proteins

Melilotate 3-monooxygenase (EC 1.14.13.4) is an enzyme that catalyzes the chemical reaction

melilotic acid
+ NADH
O_{2} + H^{+}
H_{2}O
2,3-dihydroxyphenylpropionic acid
+ NAD^{+}

The four substrates of this enzyme are melilotic acid, reduced nicotinamide adenine dinucleotide (NADH), oxygen. and a proton. Its products are 2,3-dihydroxyphenylpropionic acid, oxidised NAD^{+}, and water.

The enzyme is a flavin-containing monooxygenase that uses molecular oxygen as oxidant and incorporates one of its atoms into the starting material. The systematic name of this enzyme class is 3-(2-hydroxyphenyl)propanoate,NADH:oxygen oxidoreductase (3-hydroxylating). Other names in common use include 2-hydroxyphenylpropionate hydroxylase, melilotate hydroxylase, 2-hydroxyphenylpropionic hydroxylase, and melilotic hydroxylase. It participates in phenylalanine metabolism. It uses flavin adenine dinucleotide as a cofactor.
