= Azotemia =

Excess of nitrogen-rich compounds in the blood

- Specialty: Nephrology

Azotemia (from azot 'nitrogen' and -emia 'blood condition'), also spelled azotaemia, is a medical condition characterized by abnormally high levels of nitrogen-containing compounds (such as urea, creatinine, and other nitrogen-rich compounds) in the blood. It is largely related to insufficient or dysfunctional filtering of blood by the kidneys. It can lead to uremia and acute kidney injury if not controlled.

== Types ==
Azotemia has three classifications, depending on its causative origin: prerenal azotemia, renal azotemia, and postrenal azotemia.

Measurements of urea and creatinine (Cr) in the blood are used to assess renal function. For historical reasons, the lab test measuring urea is known as "blood urea nitrogen" (BUN) in the US. The BUN:Cr ratio is a useful measure in determining the type of azotemia and will be discussed in each section below. A normal BUN:Cr is equal to 15.

=== Prerenal azotemia ===
Prerenal azotemia is caused by a decrease in blood flow (hypoperfusion) to the kidneys. However, there is no inherent kidney disease. It can occur following hemorrhage, shock, volume depletion, congestive heart failure, adrenal insufficiency, ingestion of fatal substances such as the amanita phalloides (the "Death Cap" mushroom), and narrowing of the renal artery among other things.

The BUN:Cr in prerenal azotemia is greater than 20. The reason for this lies in the mechanism of filtration of urea and creatinine. Renal Plasma Flow (RPF) is decreased due to hypoperfusion which results in a proportional decrease in Glomerular Filtration Rate (GFR). In turn, the decreased flow and pressure to the kidney will be sensed by baroreceptors in the Juxtaglomerular (JG) Cells of the afferent arteriole. If the decrease in blood pressure is systemic (rather than occlusion of the renal artery), baroreceptors in the carotid sinus and aortic arch will be stimulated. This leads to sympathetic nerve activation, resulting in renin secretion through β_{1} receptors. Constriction of the afferent arterioles causes a decrease in the intraglomerular pressure, reducing GFR proportionally. Renin is the main effector of the juxtaglomerular baroreceptors. Renin is secreted from granules in the JG cells, and once in the blood stream, it acts as a protease to convert angiotensinogen to angiotensin I, which is converted by angiotensin converting enzyme, to angiotensin II, which, in turn, stimulates aldosterone release. Increased aldosterone levels results in salt and water absorption in the distal collecting tubule.

A decrease in volume or pressure is a non-osmotic stimulus for antidiuretic hormone production in the hypothalamus, which exerts its effect in the medullary collecting duct for water reabsorption. Through unknown mechanisms, activation of the sympathetic nervous system leads to enhanced proximal tubular reabsorption of salt and water, as well as urea (BUN), calcium, uric acid, and bicarbonate. The net result of these 4 mechanisms of salt and water retention is decreased output and decreased urinary excretion of sodium (< 20mEq/L). The increased reabsorption of Na leads to increased water and urea reabsorption from the proximal tubules of the kidney back into the blood. In contrast, creatinine is actually secreted in the proximal tubule. This generally leads to a BUN:Cr ratio greater than 20, a fractional excretion of Na of less than 1%, and an elevated urine osmolarity.

=== Primary renal azotemia ===
Renal azotemia (acute kidney failure) typically leads to uremia. It is an intrinsic disease of the kidney, generally the result of kidney parenchymal damage. Causes include kidney failure, glomerulonephritis, acute tubular necrosis, or other kidney disease.

The BUN:Cr in renal azotemia is less than 15. In cases of kidney disease, glomerular filtration rate decreases, so nothing gets filtered as well as it normally would. However, in addition to not being normally filtered, what urea does get filtered is not reabsorbed by the proximal tubule as it normally would be. This results in lower levels of urea in the blood and higher levels of urea in the urine as compared to creatinine. Creatinine filtration decreases, leading to a higher amount of creatinine in the blood. Third-spacing of fluids, as in peritonitis, osmotic diuresis, or low aldosterone states such as Addison's disease all elevate urea.

=== Postrenal azotemia ===
Blockage of urine flow in an area below the kidneys results in postrenal azotemia. It can be caused by congenital abnormalities such as vesicoureteral reflux, blockage of the ureters by kidney stones, pregnancy, compression of the ureters by cancer, prostatic hyperplasia, or blockage of the urethra by kidney or bladder stones. Like in prerenal azotemia, there is no inherent renal disease. The increased resistance to urine flow can cause back up into the kidneys, leading to hydronephrosis.

The BUN:Cr in postrenal azotemia is initially >15. The increased nephron tubular pressure (due to fluid back-up) causes increased reabsorption of urea, elevating it abnormally relative to creatinine. Persistent obstruction damages the tubular epithelium over time, and renal azotemia will result with a decreased BUN:Cr ratio.

== Signs and symptoms ==
- Oliguria or anuria (decreased or absent urine output)
- Fatigue
- Asterixis (flapping tremor)
- Decreased alertness
- Confusion
- Pale skin
- Tachycardia (rapid pulse)
- Xerostomia (dry mouth)
- Thirst
- Edema, anasarca (swelling)
- Orthostatic blood pressure (fluctuates depending on body position)
- Uremic frost, a condition that occurs when urea and urea derivatives are secreted through the skin in sweat, which evaporates away to leave solid uric compounds, resembling a frost.

A urinalysis will typically show a decreased urine sodium level, a high urine creatinine-to-serum creatinine ratio, a high urine urea-to-serum urea ratio, and concentrated urine (determined by osmolality and specific gravity). None of these is particularly useful in diagnosis.

In pre-renal and post-renal azotemias, elevation of urea exceeds that of the creatinine (i.e., BUN>12*creatinine). This is because urea is readily reabsorbed by the kidneys while creatinine is not. In congestive heart failure (a cause of pre-renal azotemia) or any other condition that causes poor perfusion of kidneys, the sluggish flow of glomerular filtrate results in excessive absorption of urea and elevation of its value in blood. Creatinine, however, is not absorbable and therefore does not rise significantly. Stasis of urine in post-renal azotemia has the same effect.

== Treatment ==
Prompt treatment of some causes of azotemia can result in restoration of kidney function; delayed treatment may result in permanent loss of renal function. Treatment may include hemodialysis or peritoneal dialysis, medications to increase cardiac output and increase blood pressure, and the treatment of the condition that caused the azotemia.

== See also ==
- Kidney failure
- Nephrology
