= Imidazoleacetate 4-monooxygenase =

Class of enzymes

imidazoleacetate 4-monooxygenase

Identifiers
- EC no.: 1.14.13.5
- CAS no.: 9029-65-6

Databases
- BRENDA: enzyme data
- ExPASy: NiceZyme view
- KEGG: enzyme entry
- MetaCyc: metabolic pathway
- Rhea: reactions
- PDB structures: RCSB PDB PDBe PDBsum
- Gene Ontology: AmiGO / QuickGO
Search
- PMC: articles
- PubMed: articles
- NCBI: proteins

In enzymology, an imidazoleacetate 4-monooxygenase (EC 1.14.13.5) is an enzyme that catalyzes the chemical reaction

4-imidazoleacetate + NADH + H^{+} + O_{2} $\rightleftharpoons$ 5-hydroxy-4-imidazoleacetate + NAD^{+} + H_{2}O

The 4 substrates of this enzyme are 4-imidazoleacetate, NADH, H^{+}, and O_{2}, whereas its 3 products are 5-hydroxy-4-imidazoleacetate, NAD^{+}, and H_{2}O.

The enzyme is a flavin-containing monooxygenase that uses molecular oxygen as oxidant and incorporates one of its atoms into the starting material. The systematic name of this enzyme class is 4-imidazoleacetate,NADH:oxygen oxidoreductase (5-hydroxylating). Other names in common use include imidazoleacetic hydroxylase, imidazoleacetate hydroxylase, and imidazoleacetic monooxygenase. This enzyme participates in histidine metabolism. It employs one cofactor, FAD.
