= 1-Naphthyl isothiocyanate =

- Skeletal formula of 1-naphthyl isothiocyanate

Names
- Preferred IUPAC name 1-Isothiocyanatonaphthalene
- Other names 1-Naphthylisothiocyanate; α-Naphthyl isothiocyanate; Kesscocide

Identifiers
CAS Number	551-06-4
3D model (JSmol)	Interactive image; Interactive image
Abbreviations	ANIT
Beilstein Reference	637868
ChEBI	CHEBI:35455
ChEMBL	ChEMBL1381098
ChemSpider	10609
ECHA InfoCard	100.008.174
EC Number	208-990-8
MeSH	1-Naphthylisothiocyanate
PubChem CID	11080
RTECS number	NX9100000
UNII	HG44814A3V
UN number	2811
CompTox Dashboard (EPA)	DTXSID8025703
- InChI: InChI=1S/C11H7NS/c13-8-12-11-7-3-5-9-4-1-2-6-10(9)11/h1-7H Key: JBDOSUUXMYMWQH-UHFFFAOYSA-N; InChI=1/C11H7NS/c13-8-12-11-7-3-5-9-4-1-2-6-10(9)11/h1-7H Key: JBDOSUUXMYMWQH-UHFFFAOYAA
- SMILES: S=C=Nc1cccc2ccccc12; S=C=NC1=CC=CC2=CC=CC=C12

Properties
Chemical formula	C_{11}H_{7}NS
Molar mass	185.24 g·mol^{−1}
Melting point	55 to 57 °C (131 to 135 °F; 328 to 330 K)

Hazards
- GHS labelling
Pictograms	(GHS06: Toxic) (GHS08: Health hazard)
Signal word	Danger
Hazard statements	H301, H312, H315, H319, H332, H334, H335
Precautionary statements	P261, P280, P301+P310, P305+P351+P338, P342+P311
- Except where otherwise noted, data are given for materials in their standard state (at 25 °C [77 °F], 100 kPa). verify (what is ?) Infobox references

1-Naphthyl isothiocyanate is a chemical compound which is an isothiocyanate derivative of naphthalene. It can be produced by the reaction of 1-Naphthylthiourea and chlorobenzene.
