= Α-Naphthylthiourea =

α-Naphthylthiourea

Names
- IUPAC name Naphthalen-1-ylthiourea
- Other names ANTU; 1-(1-Naphthyl)-2-thiourea; 1-(1-Naphthyl)thiourea; 1-Naphthylthiourea α-Naphthylthiocarbamide; 1-(Naphthalen-1-yl)thiourea; Dirax; Anturat; Rattrack; Smeesana; Alrato

Identifiers
CAS Number	86-88-4
3D model (JSmol)	Interactive image; Interactive image
Abbreviations	ANTU
ChemSpider	643492
ECHA InfoCard	100.001.552
KEGG	C19136
PubChem CID	736366
UNII	UKY0H6XJ4J
CompTox Dashboard (EPA)	DTXSID8020919
- InChI: InChI=1S/C11H10N2S/c12-11(14)13-10-7-3-5-8-4-1-2-6-9(8)10/h1-7H,(H3,12,13,14) Key: PIVQQUNOTICCSA-UHFFFAOYSA-N; InChI=1/C11H10N2S/c12-11(14)13-10-7-3-5-8-4-1-2-6-9(8)10/h1-7H,(H3,12,13,14) Key: PIVQQUNOTICCSA-UHFFFAOYAV
- SMILES: C1=CC=C2C(=C1)C=CC=C2NC(=S)N; S=C(N)Nc2cccc1ccccc12

Properties
Chemical formula	C_{11}H_{10}N_{2}S
Molar mass	202.28 g·mol^{−1}
Appearance	White solid, crystallizes in prisms from alcohol Colorless, solid. White. White, crystalline or gray powder.
Melting point	197.8 °C (388.0 °F; 470.9 K)
Boiling point	Decomposes
Solubility in water	600 mg/L
Solubility in other solvents	2.43 g/100mL (acetone); 8.6 g/100mL (triethylene glycol)
log P	1.65
Vapor pressure	6.6·10^{−6} mmHg
Henry's law constant (k_{H})	8.51·10^{−9} atm-cu m/mol

Hazards
- Occupational safety and health (OHS/OSH)
Main hazards	Toxic
NFPA 704 (fire diamond)	4 1 0
Flash point	noncombustible
- Lethal dose or concentration (LD, LC)
LD_{50} (median dose)	0.38 mg/kg (dog, oral); 6 mg/kg (rat, oral); 4250 mg/kg (monkey, oral); 5 mg/kg (mouse, oral)
- NIOSH (US health exposure limits)
PEL (Permissible)	TWA 0.3 mg/m^{3}
REL (Recommended)	TWA 0.3 mg/m^{3}
IDLH (Immediate danger)	100 mg/m^{3}
- Except where otherwise noted, data are given for materials in their standard state (at 25 °C [77 °F], 100 kPa). verify (what is ?) Infobox references

α-Naphthylthiourea (ANTU) is an organosulfur compound with the formula C_{10}H_{7}NHC(S)NH_{2}. This a white, crystalline powder although commercial samples may be off-white. It is used as a rodenticide and as such is fairly toxic. Naphthylthiourea is available as 10% active baits in suitable protein- or carbohydrate-rich materials and as a 20% tracking powder.

== Synthesis ==
Like other thioureas, ANTU can be prepared by several routes. The usual method is the reaction of 1-naphthylamine hydrochloride with ammonium thiocyanate:

[C_{10}H_{7}NH_{3}]Cl + NH_{4}SCN → C_{10}H_{7}NHC(S)NH_{2} + NH_{3} + HCl

It is produced from the reaction of 1-naphthyl isothiocyanate with ammonia.

C_{10}H_{7}NCS + NH_{3} → C_{10}H_{7}NHC(S)NH_{2}

== Mechanism of action ==
ANTU is specifically toxic in lung cells due to its conversion to a short-lived active metabolite to which it is converted in the liver, not ANTU acting directly. This damage is focused on the endothelium of pulmonary capillaries and venules, it will lead to the formation of irreversible gaps in the endothelium of pulmonary vessels. This damage can lead to pulmonary edema. In ANTU poisoning plasma, carbon and ferritin escape through a gap in the thick part of the pulmonary capillary into the interstitial tissues of the lung

== Toxicity ==
Alpha-Naphthylthiourea is toxic to inhalation, ingestion, or skin contact, although the intoxication may be delayed. According to the U.S. National Institute for Occupational Safety and Health (NIOSH), the recommended workplace airborne exposure limit is 0.3 mg/m^{3} averaged over a 10-hour workshift. Exposure to 100 mg/m^{3} is immediately dangerous to life and health. The lethal dose in humans is approximately 4 g/kg.

It is classified as an extremely hazardous substance in the United States as defined in Section 302 of the U.S. Emergency Planning and Community Right-to-Know Act (42 U.S.C. 11002), and is subject to strict reporting requirements by facilities which produce, store, or use it in significant quantities.

=== Effects on animals ===
An oral dose of 3 mg per kilogram of body weight causes the death of 50% of the rats exposed (LD_{50}), showing a very high selectivity when compared for example to monkeys ( 4000 mg per kilogram of body weight). However other studies have shown a much higher efficacy for dogs (a LD_{50} of 0.38 mg/kg).

The mortality of rats caused by 5 mg/kg of ANTU is reduced when allylthiourea, isopropylthiourea, ethylenethiourea, or ethylidenethiourea are administered simultaneously with ANTU. Superoxide dismutase, catalase and dimethylsulfoxide all protect against the lung damage by ANTU (although the results are diverse). This indicates that OH radicals are responsible for this type of lung injury. Given hydroxyurea over two days does not block the ANTU damage when neutrophils are decreased or when administered acutely. Cyclooxygenase pathway may generate the free radicals since ibuprofen blocked as well the ANTU damage.

Toxicity of alpha-Naphthyl thiourea in different animals
Organism	Test type	Route	Reported dose
Cat	LD50	oral	500 mg/kg
Chicken	LD50	intraperitoneal	2500 mg/kg
Chicken	LD50	oral	4250 mg/kg
Chicken	LD50	unreported	700 mg/kg
Dog	LD50	intraperitoneal	16 mg/kg
Dog	LD50	oral	0.38 mg/kg
Guinea pig	LD50	intraperitoneal	350 mg/kg
Man	LDLo	unreported	588 mg/kg
Monkey	LD50	intraperitoneal	175 mg/kg
Monkey	LD50	oral	4250 mg/kg
Monkey	LD50	unreported	2000 mg/kg
Mouse	LD50	intraperitoneal	10 mg/kg
Mouse	LD50	oral	5 mg/kg
Pig	LDLo	oral	50 mg/kg
Rabbit	LD50	unreported	200 mg/kg
Rat	LD50	intraperitoneal	2.47 mg/ kg
Rat	LD50	oral	6 mg/kg

ANTU causes local gastric irritation in animals and when it is absorbed, it increases permeability of the lung capillaries in all animals. The symptoms that the animals present after absorption of alpha-naphthyl thiourea are first weakness, ataxia, weak pulse and subnormal temperatures. Afterwards, they have the following symptoms: vomiting, hypersalivation, coughing and severe pulmonary edema. In the most cases a pale, mottled liver and damaged kidneys are found in animals which have ingested ANTU. Animals with an empty stomach readily vomit after ingestion of this substance. However, when there is food in the stomach of the animals the stimulation to vomit decreases, so more quantities may be absorbed. It has been found that ANTU may cause death in some animals within 2–4 hours of ingestion, while animals that survive 12 hours may recover from the poison. In a long-term, ANTU may cause pulmonary edema and pleural effusion in certain animals, such as rats. Mice treated with alpha-naphthyl thiourea with a dose of 10 mg/kg developed pulmonary edema which was maximal after three hours and was resolved by 12 hours. 35 mg/kg of ANTU was caused death to 60% of the animals. It also increases the blood sugar levels in rats. Dogs and pigs are occasionally poisoned with this compound while ruminants are resistant. But when the exposure of this compound in dogs is quite long they may have gastric irritation and respiratory difficulties. Death can then be followed within 6–48 hours depending on the quantity of ANTU ingested.

== Metabolism ==
α-Naphthylthiourea is metabolized by rat liver and lung microsomes to α-naphthylurea (ANU), which is essentially nontoxic to rats with an (LD_{50} > 800 mg/kg). Conversion of ANTU to ANU requires NADPH. Carbon monoxide inhibits the reaction. There are some evidence of cytochrome P450 being responsible for the bioactivation of ANTU. Therefore, the toxicity of ANTU cannot be explained with the activity of ANU. There are subproducts of this reaction which play an important role in toxicity: atomic sulfur and a metabolic reactive containing the thiocarbonyl carbon of ANTU.

The loss of cytochrome P-450 and monooxygenase activity seen on incubation of liver microsomes with ANTU is likely the result of the covalent binding of atomic sulfur to cytochrome P-450. The available evidence suggests that the pulmonary toxicity of ANTU results, at least in part, from the covalent binding of a cytochrome P-450 monooxygenase catalyzed metabolite of ANTU to pulmonary macromolecules. This metabolite is most likely atomic sulfur or alternatively, the one containing the thiocarbonyl carbon of ANTU. However, it is possible that the binding of both metabolites may be responsible for the lung toxicity.

Later studies have shown ANTU retains its toxicity upon inhibition of P450. They instead postulate the pulmonary endothelial enzyme flavin-containing monooxygenase 2 is primarily responsible for the toxicity of ANTU, via its sulfenic acid and sulfinic acid metabolites, which are theorised to generate reactive oxygen species by undergoing redox cycling in the presence of reductants such as glutathione.

== History ==
ANTU was developed to combat infestation of rats in the US city of Baltimore, where the increase in population had overwhelmed the sanitation services, causing huge rat-infested garbage piles. Baltimore was also the scene of the discovery of ANTU. In 1942 Curt Richter discovered that phenyl thiourea was lethal, yet tasteless to domesticated rats. This was interesting because a rat's defense against toxins is primarily its sense of taste. However, when Richter started testing the compound in wild rats, it was not equally tasteless for them, but had a bitter taste; Richter's lab screened over 200 thiourea compounds to find one equally tasteless and toxic to wild rats. This led to the discovery of ANTU.

Next Richter set out to test the compound on a large scale. He determined rats will not cross streets and therefore city blocks were used as test areas. Local Boy Scouts volunteered to distribute the poison. When the first tests returned large amounts of dead rats, the tests were extended to a 200-block area with poor housing. The ANTU field trials soon expanded and in 1943 Richter was asked to lead citywide rat control campaign and received funding to replace the Scouts with adult baiters and trappers. Through a joint effort of the city and volunteers about 8400 city blocks were cleaned from May 1943 to mid-1946. After the war ANTU became available to the public, being advertised as a miracle rat killer for households. Richter had however advised against the use of ANTU at a small scale, as rats get a 30-day tolerance for ANTU after a non-lethal dose and become able to detect the chemical. As the rat population returned, the popularity of ANTU decreased. It became clear that more than poisoning alone was needed to get rid of rats. The city of Baltimore soon returned to an environmental approach in rat control and ANTU disappeared from the market after a few years. By 1958 UK studies showed a link between those handling ANTU and a high rate of bladder related cancers and the product was withdrawn from the market by 1967. ANTU was banned for use in the Unitied States by the EPA in 1989
