= Fetor =

- Other names: Foetor
- Specialty: Various

Fetor (occasionally foetor) refers to a foul or unpleasant odor emanating from an individual.

Specific types include:

- fetor oris, another term for halitosis
- fetor hepaticus
- uremic fetor
- body odor
- rectal fetor
