= Fetor hepaticus =

Medical condition

Dimethyl sulfide

Fetor hepaticus or foetor hepaticus (Latin, "liver stench" ("fetid liver") (see spelling differences), also known as breath of the dead or hepatic foetor, is a condition seen in portal hypertension where portosystemic shunting allows thiols to pass directly into the lungs. It is a late sign in liver failure and is one of the clinical features of hepatic encephalopathy. Other possible causes are the presence of ammonia and ketones in the breath. The breath has a sweet, fecal, or musty smell to it.

The compound volatile dimethyl sulfide has been associated with it, raising the possibility of an objective noninvasive measure of liver failure. A secondary form of trimethylaminuria is also associated with liver failure, and it has been suggested that trimethylamine is also a contributor to the odor of fetor hepaticus.

== See also ==
- Fetor
