= Uremic fetor =

Urine-like smell in breath

Uremic fetor is a urine-like odor on the breath of people with uremia. The odor occurs from the smell of ammonia, which is created in the saliva as a breakdown product of urea.

Uremic fetor is usually associated with an unpleasant metallic taste (dysgeusia) and can be a symptom of chronic kidney disease. People with uremia can also develop anorexia, abdominal pain, nausea, vomiting, and gastrointestinal bleeding. These symptoms can follow gastritis, peptic ulcer disease, or mucosal ulcerations at any level of the gastrointestinal tract in persons with uremia.

== See also ==
- Fetor
