= Thioureas =

Organosulfur compounds with an >NC(=S)N< structure

General chemical structure of thioureas

In organic chemistry, thioureas are members of a family of organosulfur compounds with the formula S=C(NR_{2})_{2} and structure R_{2}N−C(=S)−NR_{2}. The parent member of this class of compounds is thiourea (S=C(NH_{2})_{2}). Substituted thioureas are found in several commercial chemicals.

== Structure and bonding ==
Thioureas have a trigonal planar molecular geometry of the N_{2}C=S core. The C=S bond distance is near 1.71 Å, which is 0.1 Å longer than in normal ketones (R_{2}C=O). The C–N bond distances are short. Thioureas occurs in two tautomeric forms.

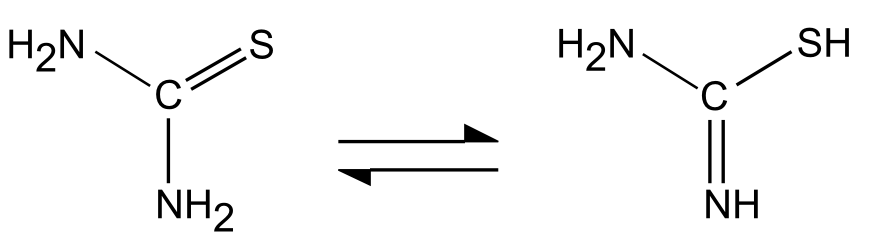

On the other hand, some compounds depicted as isothioureas and in fact thioureas, one example being mercaptobenzimidazole.

== Synthesis ==
N,N′-unsubstituted thioureas can be prepared by treating the corresponding cyanamide with hydrogen sulfide or similar sulfide sources. Organic ammonium salts react with potassium thiocyanate as the source of the thiocarbonyl (C=S).

Alternatively, N,N′-disubstituted thioureas can be prepared by coupling two amines with thiophosgene:

HNR_{2} + S=CCl_{2} → 2 S=C(NR_{2})_{2} + 2 HCl

Amines also condense with organic thiocyanates to give thioureas:

HNR_{2} + S=C=NR' → S=C(NR_{2})(NHR')

Cyclic thioureas are prepared by transamidation of thiourea with diamines. Ethylene thiourea is synthesized by treating ethylenediamine with carbon disulfide. In some cases, thioureas can be prepared by thiation of ureas using phosphorus pentasulfide.

Ethylene thiourea is an accelerant of vulcanization of neoprene and polychloroprene rubbers.

== Reactions ==
Thioureas are susceptible to tautomerization. For the parent thiourea, the thione tautomer predominates in aqueous solutions. The thiol form, known as an isothiourea, can be encountered in substituted compounds such as isothiouronium salts.

Thioureas are nucleophilic at sulfur. When they contain a pair of N-H substituents, thioureas engage in hydrogen bonding. This interaction is the basis of a research theme called thiourea organocatalysis. Thioureas are often found to be stronger hydrogen-bond donors (i.e., more acidic) than ureas.

== Applications and occurrence ==
Agrichemicals that feature the thiourea functional group include diafenthiuron, methimazole, carbimazole (converted in vivo to methimazole), and propylthiouracil. α-Naphthylthiourea is a commercial rodenticide.

Some thioureas are vulcanization accelerators.

Ergothioneine, which is derived from histidine, is a rare example of a thiourea found in nature.

The cyclic of thiourea called thiamazole is used to treat overactive thyroid
