= Uremia =

Excess urea in the blood due to kidney dysfunction

- Other names: Uraemia
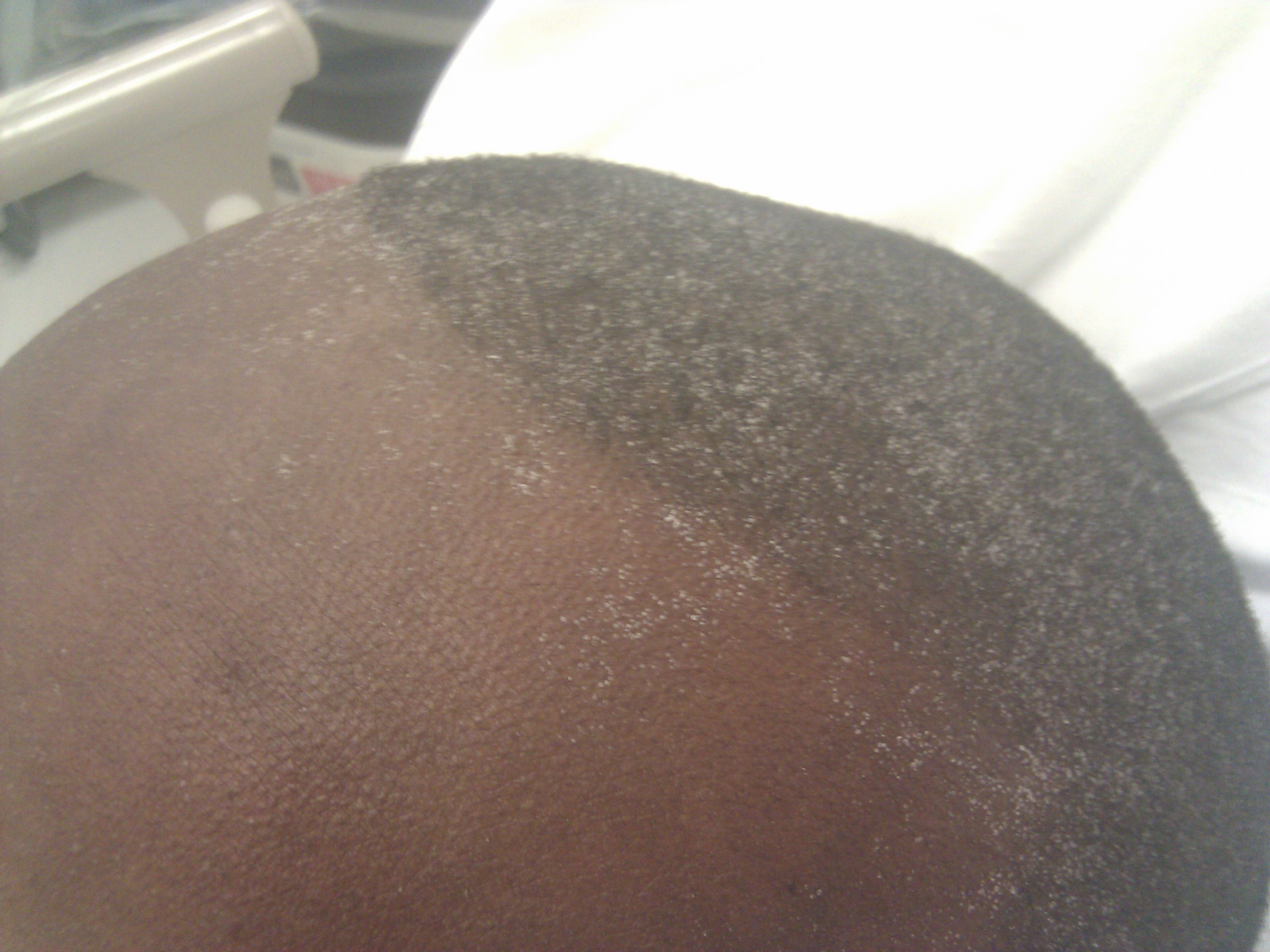
- Uremic frost present on the forehead and scalp of a young male who presented with complaints of anorexia and fatigue, with blood urea nitrogen and serum creatinine levels of approximately 100 and 50 mg/dL respectively
- Specialty: Nephrology

In medicine, uremia is the presence in the blood of high levels of urea (one of the primary components of urine). It can be defined as an excess in the blood of such end products of amino acid and protein metabolism as urea and creatinine, which would normally be excreted in the urine. By comparison, uremic syndrome can be defined as the terminal clinical manifestation of kidney failure (also called renal failure). It is the signs, symptoms and results from laboratory tests which result from inadequate excretory, regulatory, and endocrine function of the kidneys. The terms uremia and uremic syndrome have been used interchangeably to denote a very high plasma urea concentration that is the result of renal failure. The former denotation will be used for the rest of the article.

A similar, less severe condition involving high levels of urea is azotemia, in which the abnormality can be measured chemically but is not yet so severe as to produce symptoms. Uremia is thus the collection of the pathological and symptomatic manifestations of severe azotemia.

There is no specific time for the onset of uremia for people with progressive loss of kidney function. People with kidney function below 50% (i.e. a glomerular filtration rate [GFR] between 50 and 60 mL/min) and over 30 years of age may have uremia to a degree. This means an estimated 8 million people in the United States with a GFR of less than 60 mL/min have uremic symptoms. The symptoms, such as fatigue, can be very vague, making the diagnosis of impaired kidney function difficult. Treatment can be by dialysis or a kidney transplant, though some patients choose to pursue symptom control and conservative care instead.

== Signs and symptoms ==
Classical signs of uremia are: progressive weakness and easy fatigue, loss of appetite due to nausea and vomiting, muscle atrophy, tremors, abnormal mental function, frequent shallow respiration, and metabolic acidosis. Without intervention via dialysis or kidney transplant, uremia due to renal failure will progress and cause stupor, coma, and death. Because uremia is mostly a consequence of kidney failure, its signs and symptoms often occur concomitantly with other signs and symptoms of kidney failure.

Clinical features of uremia
Area affected	Signs and symptoms
Central nervous system	diurnal somnolence, night insomnia, memory and concentration disorders, asthenia, headache, confusion, fatigue, seizures, coma, encephalopathy, decreased taste and smell, hiccups, serositis
Peripheral nervous system	polyneuritis, restless legs, cramps, peripheral neuropathy, oxidative stress, reduced body temperature
Gastrointestinal	anorexia, nausea, vomiting, gastroparesis, parotitis, stomatitis, superficial gastrointestinal ulcers
Hematologic	anemia, hemostasis disorders, granulocytic, lymphocytic and thrombocytic dysfunction
Cardiovascular	hypertension, atherosclerosis, coronary artery disease, pericarditis, peripheral and pulmonary edema
Skin	itching, skin dryness, calciphylaxis, uremic frost (excretion of urea through the skin)
Endocrinology	growth impairment, impotence, infertility, sterility, amenorrhea
Skeletal	osteomalacia, β_{2}-microglobulin amyloidosis, bone disease (via vitamin D deficiency, secondary hyperparathyroidism and hyperphosphatemia)
Nutrition	malnutrition, weight loss, muscular catabolism
Other	uremic fetor
Immunity	low response rate to vaccination, increased sensitivity to infectious diseases, systemic inflammation

Glomerular filtration rate (GFR) measures the amount of plasma in millilitres being filtered through the kidneys each minute. As the GFR decreases, the prognosis worsens. Some of the effects can be reversed, albeit temporarily, with dialysis.

GFR and their effects
GFR (mL/min)	Effects
100–120	Normal GFR
<60	Uremic symptoms may be present, reduced well-being
30–60	Cognitive impairment
55	Fatigue and reduced stamina
<50	Insulin resistance
<30	Increasing likelihood of symptoms
≤15	Kidney failure

=== Residual syndrome ===
People on dialysis acquire what is known as "residual syndrome". Residual syndrome is a non-life-threatening disease which is displayed as toxic effects causing many of the same signs and symptoms that uremia displays. There are several hypotheses why residual syndrome is present. They are: the accumulation of large molecular weight solutes that are poorly dialyzed (e.g. β_{2}-microglobulin); the accumulation of protein-bound small molecular weight solutes that are poorly dialyzed (e.g., p-cresol sulfate and indoxyl sulfate); the accumulation of dialyzable solutes that are incompletely removed (e.g., sequestered solutes like phosphate in cells, or insufficient elimination of other more toxic solutes); indirect phenomena such as carbamylation of proteins, tissue calcification, or a toxic effect of hormone imbalance (e.g., parathyroid hormone); and the toxic effects of dialysis itself (e.g., removal of unknown important vitamins or minerals). Dialysis increases life span, but patients may have more limited function. They have physical limitations which include impairment of balance, walking speed, and sensory functions. They also have cognitive impairments such as impairment in attention, memory, and performance of higher-order tasks. Patients have been maintained longer than three decades on dialysis, but average mortality rates and hospitalizations are high. Also, patient rehabilitation and quality of life is poor.

== Causes ==
Urea

Conditions causing increased blood urea fall into three different categories: prerenal, renal, and postrenal.

Prerenal azotemia can be caused by decreased blood flow through the kidneys (e.g. low blood pressure, congestive heart failure, shock, bleeding, dehydration) or by increased production of urea in the liver via a high protein diet or increased protein catabolism (e.g. stress, fever, major illness, corticosteroid therapy, or gastrointestinal bleeding).

Renal causes can be attributed to decreased kidney function. These include acute and chronic kidney failure, acute and chronic glomerulonephritis, tubular necrosis, and other kidney diseases.

Postrenal causes can be due to decreased elimination of urea. These could be due to urinary outflow obstruction such as by calculi, tumours of the bladder or prostate, or a severe infection.

== Diagnosis ==
A detailed and accurate history and physical examination will help determine if uremia is acute or chronic. In the cases of acute uremia, causes may be identified and eliminated, leading to a higher chance for recovery of normal kidney function, if treated correctly.

=== Blood tests ===
Primary tests performed for the diagnosis of uremia are basic metabolic panel with serum calcium and phosphorus to evaluate the GFR, blood urea nitrogen and creatinine as well as serum potassium, phosphate, calcium and sodium levels. The principal abnormality is very low GFR (<30 mL/min). Uremia will demonstrate elevation of both urea and creatinine, likely elevated potassium, high phosphate and normal or slightly high sodium, as well as likely depressed calcium levels. As a basic work up a physician will also evaluate for anemia, and thyroid and parathyroid functions. Chronic anemia may be an ominous sign of established renal failure. The thyroid and parathyroid panels will help work up any symptoms of fatigue, as well as determine calcium abnormalities as they relate to uremia versus longstanding or unrelated illness of calcium metabolism.

=== Urine tests ===
A 24-hour urine collection for determination of creatinine clearance may be an alternative, although not a very accurate test due to the collection procedure. Another laboratory test that should be considered is urinalysis with microscopic examination for the presence of protein, casts, blood and pH.

=== Radioisotope tests ===
The most trusted test for determining GFR is iothalamate clearance. However, it may be cost-prohibitive and time-consuming. Clinical laboratories generally calculate the GFR with the modification of diet in renal disease (MDRD) formula or the Cockcroft-Gault formula.

=== Other ===
In addition, coagulation studies may indicate prolonged bleeding time with otherwise normal values.

== Mechanism ==
Uremia results in many different compounds being retained by the body. With the failure of the kidneys, these compounds can build up to dangerous levels. There are more than 90 different compounds that have been identified. Some of these compounds can be toxic to the body.

Uremic solutes
Solute group	Example	Source (Note: There may be multiple sources. Only one is listed.)	Characteristics
Peptides and small proteins	β_{2}-microglobulin	shed from major histocompatibility complex	poorly dialyzed because of large size
Guanidines	guanidinosuccinic acid	arginine	increased production in uremia
Phenols	ρ-cresyl sulfate	phenylalanine, tyrosine	protein bound, produced by gut bacteria
Indoles	indican	tryptophan	protein bound, produced by gut bacteria
Aliphatic amines	dimethylamine	choline	large volume of distribution, produced by gut bacteria
Polyols	CMPF	unknown	tightly protein bound
Ucleosides	pseudouridine	tRNA	most prominent of several altered RNA species
Dicarboxylic acids	oxalate	ascorbic acid	formation of crystal deposits
Carbonyls	glyoxal	glycolytic intermediates	reaction with proteins to form advanced glycation end-products

=== Uremic toxins ===
Uremic toxins are any biologically active compounds that are retained due to kidney impairment. Many uremic salts can also be uremic toxins.

Urea was one of the first metabolites identified. Its removal is directly related to patient survival but its effect on the body is not yet clear. Still, it is not certain that the symptoms currently associated with uremia are actually caused by excess urea, as one study showed that uremic symptoms were relieved by initiation of dialysis, even when urea was added to the dialysate to maintain the blood urea nitrogen level at approximately 90 mg per deciliter (that is, approximately 32 mmol per liter). Urea could be the precursor of more toxic molecules, but it is more likely that damage done to the body is from a combination of different compounds which may act as enzyme inhibitors or derange membrane transport. Indoxyl sulfate is one of the better characterized uremic toxins. Indoxyl sulfate has been shown to aggravate vascular inflammation in atherosclerosis by modulating macrophage behavior.

Potential uremic toxins
Toxin	Effect	References
Urea	At high concentrations [>300 mg/dL(>50 mmol/L)]: headaches, vomiting, fatigue, carbamylation of proteins	
Creatinine	Possibly affects glucose tolerance and erythrocyte survival	
Cyanate	Drowsiness and hyperglycemia, carbamylation of proteins and altered protein function due to being a breakdown product of urea	
Polyols (e.g., myoinositol)	Peripheral neuropathy	
Phenols	Can be highly toxic as they are lipid-soluble and therefore can cross cell membranes easily	
"Middle molecules" (Note: The "middle molecules" include: atrial natriuretic peptide, cystatin C, delta sleep-inducing peptide, interleukin-6, tumor necrosis factor alpha, and parathyroid hormone.)	Peritoneal dialysis patients clear middle molecules more efficiently than hemodialysis patients. They show fewer signs of neuropathy than hemodialysis patients	
β_{2}-Microglobulin	Renal amyloid	
Indoxyl sulfate	Induces renal dysfunction and cardiovascular dysfunction; associated with chronic kidney disease and cardiovascular disease	
ρ-cresyl sulfate	Accumulates in and predicts chronic kidney disease	

=== Biochemical characteristics ===
Many regulatory functions of the body are affected. Regulation of body fluids, salt retention, acid and nitrogenous metabolite excretion are all impaired and can fluctuate widely. Body fluid regulation is impaired due to a failure to excrete fluids, or due to fluid loss from vomiting or diarrhea. Regulation of salt is impaired when salt intake is low or the vascular volume is inadequate. Acid excretion and nitrogenous metabolite excretion are impaired with the loss of kidney function.

Biochemistry
Retained nitrogenous metabolites	Fluid, acid-base, and electrolyte disturbances	Carbohydrate intolerance	Anormal lipid metabolism	Altered endocrine function
Urea	Fixed urine osmolality	Insulin resistance (hypoglycemia may also occur)	Hypertriglyceridemia	Secondary hyperparathyroidism
Cyanate	Metabolic acidosis	Plasma insulin normal or increased	Decreased high-density lipoprotein cholesterol	Altered thyroxine metabolism
Creatinine	Hyponatremia or hypernatremia or hypercalcemia	Delayed response to carbohydrate loading	Hyperlipoproteinemia	Hyperreninemia and hyperaldosteronism
Guanidine compounds	Hyperchloremia	Hyperglucagonemia		Hyporeninemia
"Middle molecules"	Hypocalcemia			Hypoaldosteronism
Uric acid	Hyperphosphatemia			Decreased erythropoietin production
	Hypermagnesemia			Gonadal dysfunction (increased prolactin and luteinizing hormone, decreased testosterone)
	Decreased sodium-potassium ATPase activity			Increased serum gastrin and melanocyte-stimulating hormone

== History ==
Urea was crystallized and identified between 1797 and 1808. Urea was hypothesized to be the source of urinary ammonia during this time and was confirmed in 1817. It was hypothesized that excess urea may lead to specific disorders. Later in 1821, it was confirmed that the body did produce urea and that it was excreted by the kidneys. In 1827, urea was first synthesized in the lab, confirming the composition of urea and making it the first biological substance synthesized. In 1856, urea was produced in vitro via oxidation of proteins. It was in 1827 that Henri Dutrochet seeded the idea of dialysis with the discovery of separating smaller molecules from larger molecules through a semipermeable membrane. In 1829 and 1831, convincing proof was obtained that in certain patients, blood urea was elevated. They also suggested that harm may be caused by this. Later research suggested that major neurological disorders like coma and convulsions did not correlate with physical findings which included generalized edema of the brain. This suggested that uremia was a form of blood poisoning. In 1851, E.T. Frerich described clinical uremic syndrome and suggested that a toxicity was the mechanism of its cause. It was in 1856 that J. Picard developed a sensitive method to reproducibly measure blood urea. He detected a 40% decrease of urea concentration between the renal artery and the renal vein. This work solidified the fact that renal failure coincided with an increase in blood urea. J. Picard with E.T. Frerich's work made the term uremia popular.

== Oral manifestations ==
Oral symptoms of uremia can be found in up to 90% of renal patients. The patients may present with ammonia-like taste and smell in mouth, stomatitis, gingivitis, decreased salivary flow, xerostomia and parotitis.

One of the early symptoms of renal failure is uremic fetor. It is an ammonia odour in the mouth caused by the high concentration of urea in the saliva, which subsequently breaks down to ammonia. As the blood urea nitrogen (BUN) level increases, patients might develop uremic stomatitis. Uremic stomatitis appears as a pseudo membrane or frank ulcerations with redness and a pultaceous coat in the mouth. These lesions could be related to high BUN level (>150 mg/dL), and disappear spontaneously when the BUN level is reduced with medical treatment. It is believed to be caused by loss of tissue resistance and failure to withstand traumatic influences. Besides that, the patient may develop a rare manifestation called uremic frost. It is a white plaque found on the skin or in the mouth which is caused by residual urea crystals left on the epithelial surface after perspiration and saliva evaporation, or as a result of reduced salivary flow. Xerostomia is a common oral finding. It results from a combination of direct involvement of salivary glands, chemical inflammation, dehydration and mouth breathing. It may be due to restricted fluid intake, an adverse effect of drug therapy, or low salivary rate. Salivary swelling can also be seen in some cases.

In patients with renal disease, pallor of the oral mucosa can sometimes be noticed due to anaemia caused by reduction of erythropoietin. Uraemia can lead to alteration of platelet aggregation. This situation, combined with the use of heparin and other anticoagulants in haemodialysis, causes these patients to become predisposed to ecchymosis, petechiae, and haemorrhages in the oral cavity. It can also lead to mucositis and glossitis, which can bring about pain and inflammation of the tongue and oral mucosa. In addition, patients might also experience altered taste sensations (dysgeusia) and be predisposed to bacterial and candidiasis infections. Candidiasis is more frequent in renal transplant patients because of generalized immunosuppression.

In children with renal disease, enamel hypoplasia of the primary and permanent dentition has been observed. The abnormalities of dental development correlate with the age at which metabolic disturbances occur. For example, enamel hypoplasia in the form of white or brown discoloration of primary teeth is commonly seen in young children with early-onset renal disease. Poor oral hygiene, a carbohydrate-rich diet, disease-related debilitation, hypoplastic enamel, low salivary flow rate and long-term medication contribute to increased risk of cavity formation. However, the patients usually have low cavity activity, particularly in children. This is due to the presence of highly buffered and alkaline saliva caused by the high concentration of urea nitrogen and phosphate in saliva. The salivary pH will usually be above the critical pH level for demineralization of the enamel to occur, and this helps to prevent the formation of cavities. Besides that, pulpal narrowing and calcifications are a frequent finding in patients with renal disease. For patients who are on dialysis, the nausea and vomiting resulting from dialysis treatment may lead to severe tooth erosion.

== Dental considerations ==
When treating patients with renal insufficiency, a dentist should collect a complete medical history, with particular attention to ESRD-related illnesses, drugs with prescribed dosages, blood parameters, timing, and type of dialysis performed. These aspects can be directly discussed with the nephrologist when necessary. Any alterations in drugs or other aspects of treatment must be previously agreed upon by the nephrologist.

Dental examination for such patients consists of a non-invasive complete assessment of dental, periodontal, and mucosal tissues, with radiographs to aid with the diagnostic process. All potential foci of infection should be intercepted; these include periodontal and endodontic lesions, residual roots, partially erupted and malpositioned third molars, peri-implantitis, and mucosal lesions. When periodontitis is suspected, a periodontal chart should be recorded. Orthodontic appliances can be maintained if they do not interfere with oral hygiene.

Uremia is commonly seen in patients who undergo dialysis due to renal insufficiency. For hemodialysis patients, it is important to determine the treatment schedule. Dental treatment should be started on the day after hemodialysis due to several reasons: there is no accumulation of uremic toxins in the blood, and circulating heparin is absent. Treatment should not commence on the same day as hemodialysis as patients usually feel unwell and their blood is heparinized, which might cause excessive bleeding. For patients undergoing peritoneal dialysis, there are no contraindications to dental treatment except in cases of acute peritoneal infections, where elective procedure should be deferred.

Special care should be taken when positioning the patient, avoiding compression of the arm with the vascular access for hemodialysis. Any injections or blood pressure measurement should not be performed on an arm with an arteriovenous (AV) fistula. If the AV site is located on a leg, the patient should avoid sitting for lengthy periods, as venous drainage may be obstructed. During long dental procedures, the dentist should allow patients with AV sites on their legs to take a brief walk or stand for a while every hour.

Hemostatic aids should be instituted in cases of excessive bleeding, which is commonly seen in uremia and renal failure. To manage postoperative bleeding, primary closure techniques and local hemostatic agents should be used routinely. To reduce bleeding during and after a procedure, tranexamic acid, either as a rinse or administered orally, can be used.

Patients undergoing dialysis are exposed to numerous transfusions and renal failure-related immunosuppression; thus, they are at greater risks of infection by human immunodeficiency virus (HIV) and hepatitis types B and C. It is important to adopt infection control measures to avoid cross-contamination in the dental clinic and prevent risk of exposure to dental personnel.

A majority of medications are eliminated from the body at least partially by the kidney. Renal failure prolongs the plasma half-lives of drugs normally excreted in urine, leading to increased toxicity. Many drugs which are normally safely administered cannot be given to patients with reduced renal function. Other drugs can be given at a reduced dosage. However, in patients undergoing dialysis, reduced plasma half-lives of drugs will be observed. Antibiotics of the aminoglycoside and tetracycline families need to be avoided due to their nephrotoxicities. The antibiotics of choice are penicillins, clindamycin, and cephalosporins, which can be administered at normal doses even if the therapeutic range will be extended. For analgesics, paracetamol is the option of choice for cases of episodic pain. Aspirin is characterized by an anti-platelet activity and thus its use should be avoided in uremic patients. The challenge in pharmacotherapy for patients with renal disease is to maintain a medication's therapeutic level within a narrow range in order to avoid subtherapeutic dosing and toxicity.
