= Ethylene thiourea =

Names
- Preferred IUPAC name Imidazolidine-2-thione
- Other names 1,3-Ethylene-2-thiourea, N,N-Ethylenethiourea

Identifiers
CAS Number	96-45-7
3D model (JSmol)	Interactive image
ChemSpider	2005851
ECHA InfoCard	100.002.280
PubChem CID	2723650
UNII	24FOJ4N18S
CompTox Dashboard (EPA)	DTXSID5020601
- InChI: InChI=1S/C3H6N2S/c6-3-4-1-2-5-3/h1-2H2,(H2,4,5,6) Key: PDQAZBWRQCGBEV-UHFFFAOYSA-N; InChI=1/C3H6N2S/c6-3-4-1-2-5-3/h1-2H2,(H2,4,5,6) Key: PDQAZBWRQCGBEV-UHFFFAOYAQ
- SMILES: C1CNC(=S)N1

Properties
Chemical formula	C_{3}H_{6}N_{2}S
Molar mass	102.16 g·mol^{−1}
Appearance	White solid
Odor	Faint, amine-like
Melting point	203 °C (397 °F; 476 K)
Boiling point	347.18 °C (656.92 °F; 620.33 K)
Solubility in water	2% (30 °C)
Vapor pressure	16 mmHg (20 °C)

Hazards
- Occupational safety and health (OHS/OSH)
Main hazards	combustible
Flash point	252.2 °C (486.0 °F; 525.3 K)
- Lethal dose or concentration (LD, LC)
LD_{50} (median dose)	1832 mg/kg (oral, rat)
- NIOSH (US health exposure limits)
PEL (Permissible)	None
REL (Recommended)	Ca Use encapsulated form.
IDLH (Immediate danger)	Ca [N.D.]
- Except where otherwise noted, data are given for materials in their standard state (at 25 °C [77 °F], 100 kPa). Infobox references

Ethylene thiourea (ETU) is an organosulfur compound with the formula C_{3}H_{6}N_{2}S. It is an example of an N,N-disubstituted thiourea. It is a white solid. It is synthesized by treating ethylenediamine with carbon disulfide.

Ethylene thioureas are an excellent accelerant of vulcanization of neoprene rubbers. In commercial use is the N,N'-diphenylethylenethiourea. Due to reproductive toxicity, carcinogenicity, and mutagenicity, alternatives are being sought to the ethylenethioureas. One candidate replacement is N-methyl-2-thiazolidinethione.

Ethylene thiourea can be used as a biomarker of exposure to ethylenebisdithiocarbamates (EBDTCs), which are frequently employed as fungicides in agriculture, mainly on fruits, vegetables and ornamental plants.

== EPA classification ==
EPA (United States Environmental Protection Agency) has classified ethylene thiourea as a Group B2, probable human carcinogen. Ethylene thiourea has been shown to be a potent teratogen (causes birth defects) in rats orally or dermally exposed.

== See also ==
- Mercaptobenzothiazole - a cyclic dithiocarbamate also used as a vulcanization accelerant
