= Uremic frost =

Crystallized urea deposits on skin

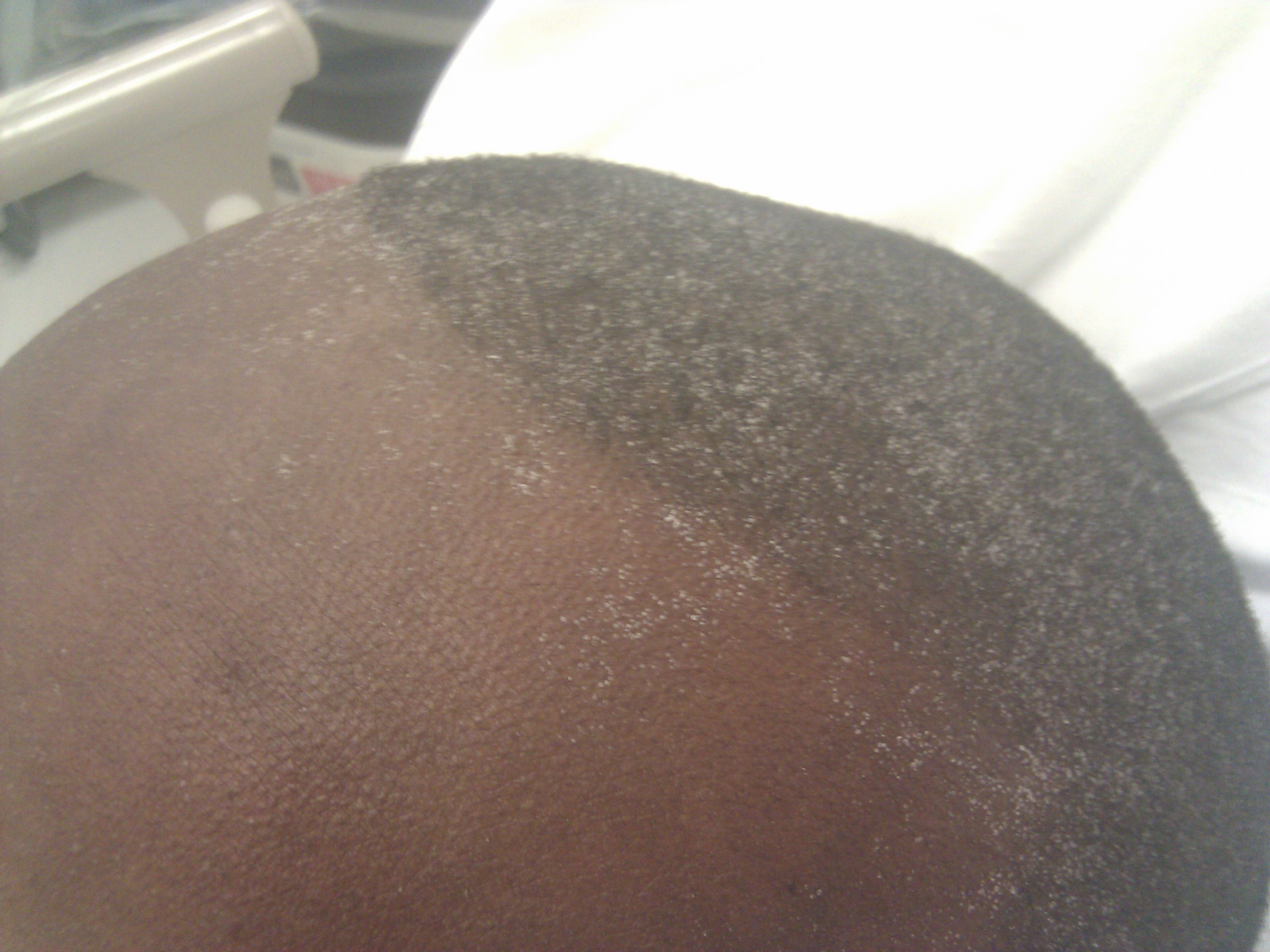
Uremic frost on forehead and scalp

Uremic frost is a colloquial description for crystallized urea deposits that can be found on the skin of those affected by chronic kidney disease (CKD) and uremia. It was first described in 1856 by the Austrian physician Anton Drasche.

The condition arises when high blood urea levels lead to high secretion of urea by sweat glands as a component of sweat. As water evaporates off the skin, it results in crystallization of the remaining urea which appear as white salts over the skin. This condition is more common in severe, untreated uremia and is associated with serum blood urea nitrogen (BUN) levels above 200. It is becoming rare in people with chronic kidney disease managed on long-term hemodialysis, with estimated prevalence between 0.8 and 3%.
