= Trimethylaminuria =

- Other names: Primary trimethylaminuria
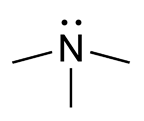
- Trimethylamine
- Specialty: Endocrinology

Trimethylaminuria (TMAU), also known as fish odor syndrome or fish malodor syndrome, is a rare metabolic disorder that causes a defect in the normal production of an enzyme named flavin-containing monooxygenase 3 (FMO3). When FMO3 is not working correctly or if not enough enzyme is produced, the body loses the ability to properly convert the rotting fish-smelling chemical trimethylamine (TMA) from precursor compounds in food digestion into trimethylamine oxide (TMAO), through a process called N-oxidation.

Trimethylamine can temporarily build up in the bloodstream and is released in the person's urine, sweat, and breath, giving off a rotten fish odor. Primary trimethylaminuria is caused by genetic mutations that affect the FMO3 function of the liver. Symptoms matching TMAU can also occur when there is no genetic cause, yet excessive TMA is excreted - this has been described as secondary trimethylaminuria (TMAU2).

== Symptoms and signs ==
Trimethylamine is most noticeable in urine, as it is captured, concentrated, and released in intervals. Fishy-smelling urine is a primary identifying symptom in infant children (trimethylaminuria literally meaning "trimethylamine in urine").

Trimethylamine is also released in a person's sweat, sexual fluids, and breath, and can give off a rotten fish odor when the concentration of trimethylamine is high enough to be detected. The intensity of the smell is directly correlated with the concentration of trimethylamine in the bloodstream.

People with TMAU may have an intermittent rotten fish-like body odor, depending on diet and the severity of their FM03 mutation. In a 2011 study by Wise and colleagues of 115 positively identified TMAU subjects, after a choline challenge load test (intentionally ingesting a TMA precursor), only 10% expressed a smell at a social distance. In a fasted state (12 hours), 0% had a smell detectable at a social distance, and only 5% had some minor malodour at an intimate distance. These findings suggested that those who produced an odour had a more severe form of FMO3 impairment.

Smell events are often sporadic and episodic in nature (based on diet over the previous 24 hours), making it often difficult to diagnose by smell alone. Some people with trimethylaminuria report having a strong odor all the time, but there has not been any evidence apart from self-reported symptoms that this is the case.

Individuals with this condition do not have any physical symptoms, and they typically appear healthy.

For unknown reasons, the condition seems more common in women than in men. Scientists suspect that such female sex hormones as progesterone and estrogen aggravate the condition. According to several reports, the condition worsens around puberty. In women, symptoms may worsen just before and during menstrual periods, after taking oral contraceptives, and around menopause.

== Genetics ==
Trimethylaminuria has an autosomal recessive pattern of inheritance.

Most cases of trimethylaminuria appear to be inherited in an autosomal recessive pattern, which means two copies of the gene in each cell are altered. The parents of an individual with an autosomal recessive disorder are both carriers of one copy of the altered gene. Carriers are asymptomatic and are not at risk of developing the disorder.

Mutations in the FMO3 gene, which is found on the long arm of chromosome 1, cause trimethylaminuria. The FMO3 gene makes an enzyme that is primarily responsible for neutralisng several amines, including trimethylamine. It also plays a primary or secondary role in oxidising several exogenous xenobiotics (Mostly "-amine" drugs not naturally produced in the body, see FMO3) including Tyramine, Amphetamines, Benzydamine, and nicotine (the effect of which is under-researched). Normally, the FMO3 enzyme converts fishy-smelling trimethylamine into trimethylamine N-oxide which has no odor. If the enzyme is missing or its activity is reduced because of a mutation in the FMO3 gene, trimethylamine is not broken down and instead builds up in the body. As the compound is released in a person's sweat, urine, and breath, it causes the strong odor characteristic of trimethylaminuria.

There are more than 40 known mutations associated with TMAU. Loss-of-function mutations, nonsense mutations, and missense mutations are three of the most common. Nonsense and missense mutations cause the most severe phenotypes.

There are several changes in the coding part of FMO3 that are common enough to count as ordinary human variation, appearing on more than 1% of gene copies in at least one population group. These are generally classified as benign mutations that do not affect TMAU.

The most common is E158K (c.472G>A, rs2266782). It is carried on roughly 40–45% of gene copies in Europeans, about 45% in Africans and about 30% in Asian populations. Next is N285= (c.855C>T, rs909530), at about 45% in Africans, 40% in Japanese people and 25% in Europeans. E308G (c.923A>G, rs2266780) is found on about 20% of gene copies in Europeans, 10% in Asian populations and 4% in Africans. Taken one at a time, these changes have little or no effect on how well the enzyme converts trimethylamine. Both E158K and E308G are formally classified as benign for trimethylaminuria in ClinVar, the public database of variant interpretations, and laboratory studies of enzyme function describe them as common variants not associated with the disorder.

There is one qualification to the above; Inheriting two copies of E158K and E308G does reduce enzyme activity more than either change alone, and has been linked to mild or temporary trimethylaminuria with babies and young children, whose FMO3 gene is not yet fully switched on. In adults there is less of an impact - a study of 528 people in Sicily and Sardinia looked at those with this genotype, and while their enzyme activity was measurably reduced on urine testing, none had noticeable body and breath odour typical of TMAU. While genetic and urinary testing is useful to determine the reason for an unusual trimethylamine odor, the tests themselves do not dictate that there will be detectable odor symptoms.

Diagnosis based on common genetic mutations can lead to cases where people believe they have TMAU when they do not have a noticeable odor condition. Bouchemal, et al studied 11 adults who had identified themselves as having TMAU, that had high distress over odor concerns, however none had confirmation of an odor. They found that "their common polymorphic variants, not found in all, are unlikely to be functionally relevant and could mislead the diagnosis of TMAU. The biochemical validation of TMAU diagnosis can be made only for cases where (i) the odor is confirmed by the physician(s) or the parents, and (ii) the malodor begins during childhood. [...] Differential diagnosis with regard to psychological disorders is crucial. Most people complaining of unpleasant body odor are ultimately diagnosed with olfactory reference syndrome (ORS); this is characterized by a preoccupation with body odor that results in significant distress and functional impairment"

== Metabolic pathway ==
Formation of TMA by gut microbes from dietary precursors, with the responsible enzymes

Trimethylamine enters the body via the consumption of certain foods and supplements:

- When food is consumed that contains TMA and/or TMAO (predominately seafood; saltwater fish, shellfish, seaweed and kelp). TMAO is converted by bacteria in the lower gastrointestinal tract (gut) into TMA.
- When a food substance, supplement or medicine that contains a TMA precursor (choline or carnitine) is ingested. Some precursor is absorbed into the bloodstream in the small intestine before reaching the gut (the RDI of choline is 450–550 mg per day, which is absorbed this way), however there is a limit to the transport capacity of the intestine, and not all precursor is exposed to the process. Unabsorbed precursor ends up in the gut. Certain bacteria in the gut can convert those precursors to TMA, the proportion of precursor converted to TMA is related to the amount of specific bacteria in the gut but on average 63% of excess choline, and 31% of carnitine (±13%) are converted to TMA.

TMA in the gut is absorbed through the intestinal lining and enters the bloodstream, where it is processed by the liver. A healthy liver produces an abundance of the enzyme FMO3, which neutralises the TMA by oxidising it to an odourless TMAO. If FMO3 enzyme production is compromised, or there is too much TMA for the amount of enzyme, then TMA will continue to circulate in the bloodstream until enough enzyme is produced.

Regradless of FMO3 capacity, while TMA is in the bloodstream it is filtered out via the kidneys (95% over 24 hours) to the bladder, and slowly exits the body in bodily fluids; urine, sweat, saliva, reproductive fluids and breath (as body fluids draw liquid from plasma in the bloodstream). TMA has no known interactions with any known internal or organ function.

Although lecithin, creatinine and betaine are technically precursors to TMA, pilot studies have shown no significant effect on the production of excess TMA/TMAO in urinary analysis at normal dietary levels of consumption. When taken in large quantities (12g/day) betaine has been known to cause fish odor symptoms, meaning that there is some conversion of betaine to TMA if supplements are taken regularly.

As noted in the above diagram, the precursors of trimethylamine all contain trimethylamine as a major element (moiety) of the chemical structure, which is severed by bacterial enzymes. No other dietary constituents are known to be significant sources of trimethylamine. The major components of food contain no trimethylamine structure at all: sugars, starches and dietary fibre, triglyceride fats, proteins, amino acids, and alcohols such as ethanol cannot give rise to trimethylamine.

== Diagnosis ==
Measurement of urine for the ratio of trimethylamine to trimethylamine N-oxide is the standard screening test. A blood test is available to provide genetic analysis. The prominent enzyme responsible for TMA N-oxygenation is coded by the FMO3 gene.

False positives can occur in the following conditions, where elevated TMA can be present in the urine without any underlying TMAU:

- Urinary tract infection
- Bacterial vaginosis
- Cervical cancer
- Advanced liver or kidney disease

A similar foul-smelling odor of the urine has also been associated with colonization of the urinary tract with a bacterium called Aerococcus urinae, especially in children.

Consumption of certain Brassica vegetables, in particular brussels sprouts, due to dietary indoles reducing FMO3 activity - research found that a diet including 300g of brussels sprouts per day for 3 weeks temporarily reduced FMO3 capability from 90%+ to ~70%. No odour was reported on any of the participants. This may result in minor secondary TMAU result.

Olfactory reference syndrome is a condition where there is a persistent false belief and preoccupation with the idea of emitting an abnormal body odor. According to McNiven at a Canadian genetics clinic, 83% of referrals for genetic testing for TMAU were deemed likely to instead have ORS. Findings found that the use of "fecal/sewage" as a description, and the use of multiple descriptors of the smell, and 'incorrect' locations of smell origin effectively differentiated ORS from TMAU. In the literature on body odour identification, emphasis is frequently placed on multiple consultations to reduce the risk of misdiagnosis, and also asking the individual to have a reliable confidant accompany them to the consultation who can confirm the reality of the reported symptom. ORS patients are unable to provide such confidants as they have no objective odor.

Unrelated fecal smells are an often misinterpreted self reported symptom associated with TMAU, Cashman JR found that 53% of TMAU and 59% of non-TMAU subjects suffered from regular halitosis, caused by dental plaque on the back of the tongue, which produced on average "200-600 ppb of sulfurous/fecal smelling volatile sulfur compounds (i.e., VSC: hydrogen sulfide; methylmercaptan; dimethylsulfide) with each exhalation, creating a 'malodorous cloud' in their vicinity". It is possible that other causes such as halitosis, haemorrhoids, regular bromhidrosis, ORS or in severe cases, a bowel obstruction leading to fecal vomiting may be the cause of fecal smells.

There is the possibility that someone may suffer from both Trimethylaminuria and ORS-like paranoia, due to the potential lack of ability to smell the odour oneself and the worry that it generates. It is recommended to organise reliable confidants, colleagues, friends or relatives ("odor buddies") to work with the sufferer to discreetly inform them if they are presenting an odour.

Affected individuals experience shame and embarrassment, fail to maintain relationships, avoid contact with people who comment on their condition, and are obsessive about masking the odour with hygiene products and even smoking. The malodorous aspect can have serious and destructive effects on schooling, personal life, career and relationships, resulting in social isolation, low self-esteem, depression, paranoid behaviour, and suicide. Delayed diagnosis, body odour and the lack of cure may lead to psychosocial issues. When the condition is suspected or known to occur in a family, genetic testing can be helpful in identifying the specific individuals who have or carry the disorder.

The metabolic and clinical manifestations of TMAU are generally regarded as benign, as there is no associated organ dysfunction. This designation, and the fact that the condition is often unrecognised by doctors, misdiagnosed and can have important ramifications including missed or delayed diagnosis.

== Treatment ==
There is no known permanent cure for primary trimethylaminuria, but symptoms can in most cases be managed via diet, and sometimes by certain supplements (as below).

Diet and supplement use should be overseen by medical professionals and nutritionists, as dietary restrictions can have other serious adverse health effects. Choline in particular is an essential nutrient required for proper neural formation in foetal and childhood development, if pregnant or breast-feeding a low choline diet should be avoided.

Ways of reducing the fishy odor may include:

- Avoiding all seafood, including fish, shellfish, kelp, and seaweed. Sea life contains TMAO, which is used as an osmolyte to counter hydrostatic pressure underwater.
- Reducing the consumption of foods and supplements that contain carnitine, such as red meat (beef, lamb and pork), liver, and offal. A study performed by Wang Z found that when comparing diets where the main protein source was red meat, white meat and non-meat protein sources, consumption of red meat increased the production of TMAO, whereas white meat and non-meat protein diets generated only low to negligible amounts TMAO. This study indicates that red meat is a major driver of TMA production by altering the balance of microbiota in the stomach due to the carnitine found in red meat. A further study by Crimarco A found that a 8 week plant based diet significantly reduced TMAO production, and further, that after switching the diet to include animal based protein, TMAO production was less than the participants who had only been given an animal protein based diet. The findings suggest that the microbiome in the gut is modified by a plant based diet, and for a time a person will lack the bacteria required to convert choline and carnitine into TMA at the same rate of an animal protein based diet.
- If not pregnant or breastfeeding, reducing the consumption of foods and supplements containing choline - fish, red meat, white meat, offal, egg yolks, legumes, beans, whey products, milk, and other foods that contain high levels of choline. Choline is an essential nutrient so complete elimination of choline is unadvised. As above, white meat (chicken, turkey) and plant based products may be fine to consume if red meat is predominantly avoided. Note, while raw ingredients like soybeans have a relatively high choline content, some processed products like soy sauce, soy milk and tofu have low choline content, due to dilution of ingredients, small serving size, or removal as a byproduct during the manufacturing process. It's best to check the choline content of food and the portion size for a better understanding of how much choline is being consumed.
- Vitamin B2 at 50 mg per day in combination with diet resolved smell issues for 2 children with TMAU. B2 was found to increase residual FMO3 performance in the liver, meaning more TMA is neutralised.
- Taking low doses of antibiotics such as neomycin and metronidazole in order to reduce the amount of bacteria in the gut, although this is not recommended as a long term solution due to antibiotic resistance and other side effects.
- Using slightly acidic detergent and body washes with a pH between 5.5 and 6.5

Additionally, at least one study has suggested that daily intake of the supplements activated charcoal and copper chlorophyllin may temporarily improve the quality of life of individuals afflicted with TMAU by helping their bodies to oxidize and convert TMA to the odorless N-oxide (TMAO) metabolite. Study participants experienced subjective reduction in odor as well as objective reduction in TMA and increase in TMAO concentration measured in their urine. The study found that:

- 85% of test participants experienced complete loss of detectable "fishy" odor
- 10% experienced some reduction in detectable odor
- 5% did not experience any detectable odor reduction

== Secondary trimethylaminuria ==
Although FMO3 mutations account for most known cases of trimethylaminuria, some cases are caused by other factors.

A fish-like body odor can result from extreme excess consumption of TMA precursors such as choline, carnitine and betaine (usually unobtainable via regular dietary intake, it requires high levels of supplement intake). 900mg of trimethylamine, 8g-20g of choline, 3g of carnitine or 20g betatine has been known to cause temporary TMAU-like fish odour symptoms. These symptoms only last until supplement intake has ceased. Note, the RDI for choline is 450-550mg and most typical diets fall below this value, so an excessive amount of precursor is required.

Two cases of the disorder have been identified in adults with liver damage caused by hepatitis. It is unknown if these cases were temporary or not as the individuals did not return for subsequent testing.

In the case where someone is experiencing liver failure or kidney failure, TMA is sometimes an element present as part of fetor hepaticus, the "breath of the dead".

=== TMAU2 and gut dysbiosis ===
There are no studies or case reports that identify gut dysbiosis as a cause for secondary trimethylaminuria. Between the years of 1997 and 2017, Sheffield Children's Hospital in England diagnosed several hundred people with TMAU2, and suggested the majority to be caused by dysbiosis in the gut. There is no reference to scientific research confirming gut dysbiosis alone can cause TMAU2, and this type of diagnosis was not produced at other testing sites. Cases were claimed to be successfully cured with antibiotics and dietary changes as above. In 2017 a new gas chromatography machine and testing procedure was introduced, which has far fewer false positive results, and very few (if any) TMAU2 results.

While the balance of gut bacteria does play a part in the amount of TMA being produced from precursors in the gut (antibiotic treatment temporarily stops odour), gut bacteria in general convert a significant proportion of dietary TMA precursors already. For example, on average 63% of excess choline, and 31% of carnitine (+-13%) are converted to TMA by an average gut profile - even if dysbiosis raised these values to 100%, it would still not meet the thresholds as above for precursor overload on a regular diet. TMAU2 by gut dysbiosis is currently a hypothetical condition requiring further research.

== History ==
The first clinical case of TMAU was described in 1970. Her mother related that her child, a 6 year old girl, had intermittently had a peculiar "fishy" odour. Analysis of her urine showed an elevated level of trimethylamine, and that a chemically pure free base sample of trimethylamine smelled similar to the patient's fishy odor. They tested her condition by giving her more trimethylamine, which substantially increased her odour (which it did not in control subjects).

In 2007 the evolution of the FMO3 gene was studied, including the evolution of some mutations associated with TMAU.

== Society and culture ==
In 2014, singer/songwriter Cassie Graves was first featured in the Daily Mail, the Daily Mirror, and The Metro UK newspapers in both print and Online, giving an interview about her experiences with Trimethylaminuria. The article was later repurposed in media across the globe, most notably by HuffPost. The condition featured as a minor storyline in an episode of the hit U.K. drama Doc Martin series five, episode 4.

In Alexander Payne's 2023 movie The Holdovers, the central character Paul Hunham (played by Paul Giamatti), has the condition.
