= Flavin-containing monooxygenase =

Class of enzymes

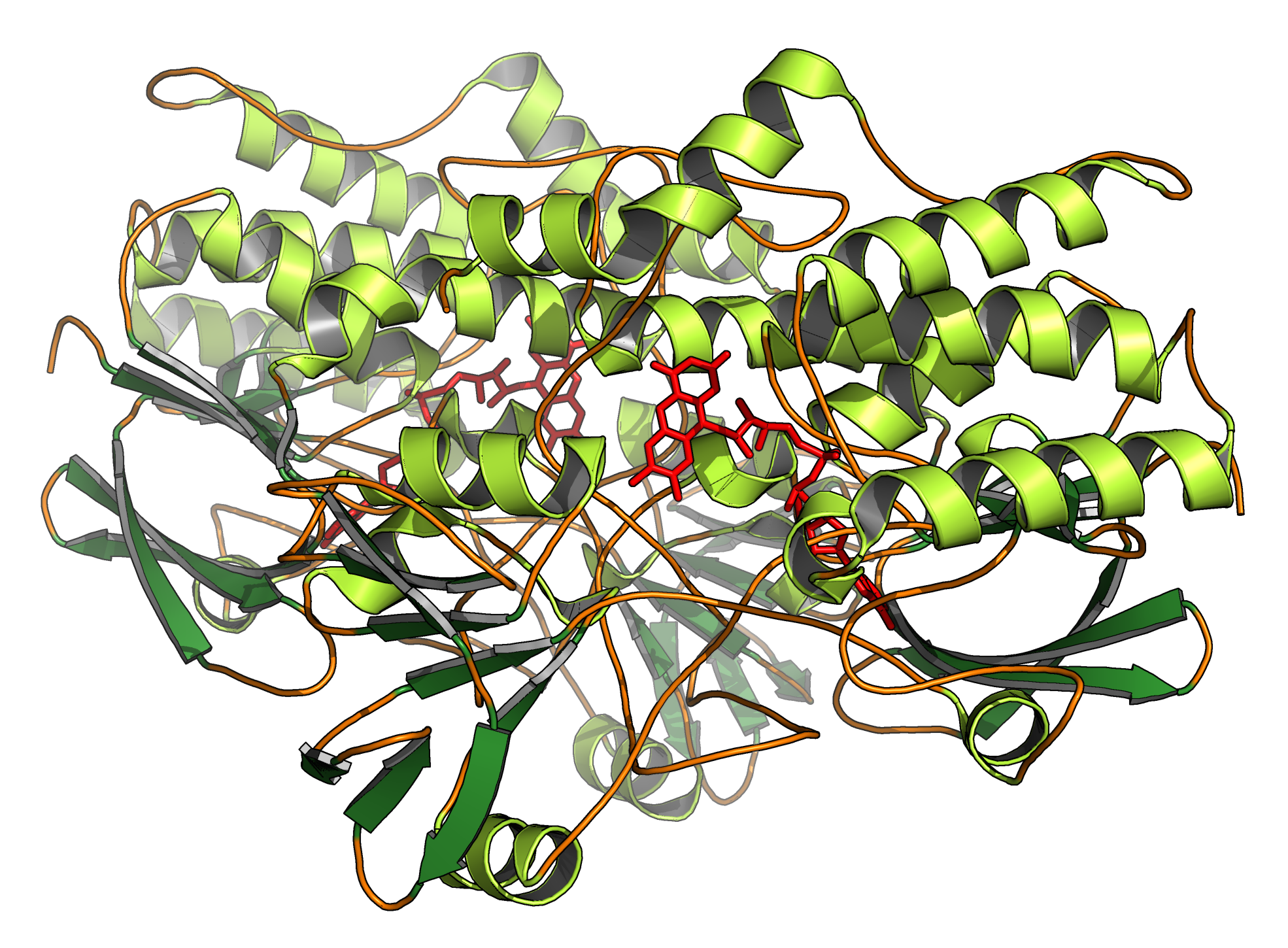
- Ribbon diagram of yeast FMO (PDB: 1VQW).

Identifiers
- EC no.: 1.14.13.8
- CAS no.: 37256-73-8

Databases
- IntEnz: IntEnz view
- BRENDA: BRENDA entry
- ExPASy: NiceZyme view
- KEGG: KEGG entry
- MetaCyc: metabolic pathway
- PRIAM: profile
- PDB structures: RCSB PDB PDBe PDBsum
- Gene Ontology: AmiGO / QuickGO
Search
- PMC: articles
- PubMed: articles
- NCBI: proteins

Flavin-containing monooxygenase FMO

Identifiers
- Symbol: Flavin_mOase
- Pfam: PF00743
- InterPro: IPR000960
- Membranome: 262
Available protein structures:
- PDB: IPR000960 PF00743 (ECOD; PDBsum)
- AlphaFold: IPR000960; PF00743

The flavin-containing monooxygenase (FMO) protein family specializes in the oxidation of xeno-substrates in order to facilitate the excretion of these compounds from living organisms. These enzymes can oxidize a wide array of heteroatoms, particularly soft nucleophiles, such as amines, sulfides, and phosphites. This reaction requires an oxygen, an NADPH cofactor, and an FAD prosthetic group. FMOs share several structural features, such as a NADPH binding domain, FAD binding domain, and a conserved arginine residue present in the active site. Recently, FMO enzymes have received a great deal of attention from the pharmaceutical industry both as a drug target for various diseases and as a means to metabolize pro-drug compounds into active pharmaceuticals. These monooxygenases are often misclassified because they share activity profiles similar to those of cytochrome P450 (CYP450), which is the major contributor to oxidative xenobiotic metabolism. However, a key difference between the two enzymes lies in how they proceed to oxidize their respective substrates; CYP enzymes make use of an oxygenated heme prosthetic group, while the FMO family utilizes FAD to oxidize its substrates.

== History ==
Prior to the 1960s, the oxidation of xenotoxic materials was thought to be completely accomplished by CYP450. However, in the early 1970s, Dr. Daniel Ziegler from the University of Texas at Austin discovered a hepatic flavoprotein isolated from pig liver that was found to oxidize a vast array of various amines to their corresponding nitro state. This flavoprotein named "Ziegler's enzyme" exhibited unusual chemical and spectrometric properties. Upon further spectroscopic characterization and investigation of the substrate pool of this enzyme, Dr. Ziegler discovered that this enzyme solely bound FAD molecule that could form a C4a-hydroxyperoxyflavin intermediate, and that this enzyme could oxidize a wide variety of substrates with no common structural features, including phosphines, sulfides, selenium compounds, amongst others. Once this was noticed, Dr. Ziegler's enzyme was reclassified as a broadband flavin monooxygenase.

In 1984, the first evidence for multiple forms of FMOs was elucidated by two different laboratories when two distinct FMOs were isolated from rabbit lungs. Since then, over 150 different FMO enzymes have been successfully isolated from a wide variety of organisms. Up until 2002, only 5 FMO enzymes were successfully isolated from mammals. However, a group of researchers found a sixth FMO gene located on human chromosome 1. In addition to the sixth FMO discovered as of 2002, the laboratories of Dr. Ian Philips and Elizabeth Sheppard discovered a second gene cluster in humans that consists of 5 additional pseudogenes for FMO on human chromosome 1.

== Evolution of FMO gene family ==
The FMO family of genes is conserved across all phyla that have been studied so far, therefore some form of the FMO gene family can be found in all studied eukaryotes. FMO genes are characterized by specific structural and functional constraints, which led to the evolution of different types of FMO's in order to perform a variety of functions. Divergence between the functional types of FMO's (FMO 1–5) occurred before the amphibians and mammals diverged into separate classes. FMO5 found in vertebrates appears to be evolutionarily older than other types of FMO's, making FMO5 the first functionally distinct member of the FMO family. Phylogenetic studies suggest that FMO1 and FMO3 are the most recent FMO's to evolve into enzymes with distinct functions. Although FMO5 was the first distinct FMO, it is not clear what function it serves since it does not oxygenate the typical FMO substrates involved in first-pass metabolism.

Analyses of FMO genes across several species have shown extensive silent DNA mutations, which indicate that the current FMO gene family exists because of selective pressure at the protein level rather than the nucleotide level. FMO's found in invertebrates are found to have originated polyphyletically; meaning that a phenotypically similar gene evolved in invertebrates which was not inherited from a common ancestor.

== Classification and characterization ==
FMOs are one subfamily of class B external flavoprotein monooxygenases (EC 1.14.13), which belong to the family of monooxygenase oxidoreductases, along with the other subfamilies Baeyer-Villiger monooxygenases and microbial N-hydroxylating monooxygenases. FMO's are found in fungi, yeast, plants, mammals, and bacteria.

=== Mammals ===
Developmental and tissue specific expression has been studied in several mammalian species, including humans, mice, rats, and rabbits. However, because FMO expression is unique to each animal species, it is difficult to make conclusions about human FMO regulation and activity based on other mammalian studies. It is likely that species-specific expression of FMO's contributes to differences in susceptibility to toxins and xenobiotics as well as the efficiency with excreting among different mammals.

Six functional forms of human FMO genes have been reported. However, FMO6 is considered to be a pseudogene. FMOs 1–5 share between 50–58% amino acid identity across the different species. Recently, five more human FMO genes were discovered, although they fall in the category of pseudogenes.

- FMO1, FMO2, FMO3, FMO4, FMO5, FMO6

=== Yeast ===
Unlike mammals, yeast (Saccharomyces cerevisiae) do not have several isoforms of FMO, but instead only have one called yFMO. This enzyme does not accept xenobiotic compounds. Instead, yFMO helps to fold proteins that contain disulfide bonds by catalyzing O_{2} and NADPH-dependent oxidations of biological thiols, just like mammalian FMO's. An example is the oxidation of glutathione to glutathione disulfide, both of which form a redox buffering system in the cell between the endoplasmic reticulum and the cytoplasm. yFMO is localized in the cytoplasm in order to maintain the optimum redox buffer ratio necessary for proteins containing disulfide bonds to fold properly. This non-xenobiotic role of yFMO may represent the original role of the FMO's before the rise of the modern FMO family of enzymes found in mammals.

=== Plants ===
Plant FMO's play a role in defending against pathogens and catalyze specific steps in the biosynthesis of auxin, a plant hormone. Plant FMO's also play a role in the metabolism of glucosinolates. These non-xenobiotic roles of plant FMO's suggest that other FMO functions could be identified in non-plant organisms.

== Structure ==
Crystal structures have been determined for yeast (Schizosaccharomyces pombe) FMO (PDB: 1VQW) and bacterial (Methylophaga aminisulfidivorans) FMO (PDB: 2XVH). The crystal structures are similar to each other and they share 27% sequence identity. These enzymes share 22% and 31% sequence identity with human FMOs, respectively.

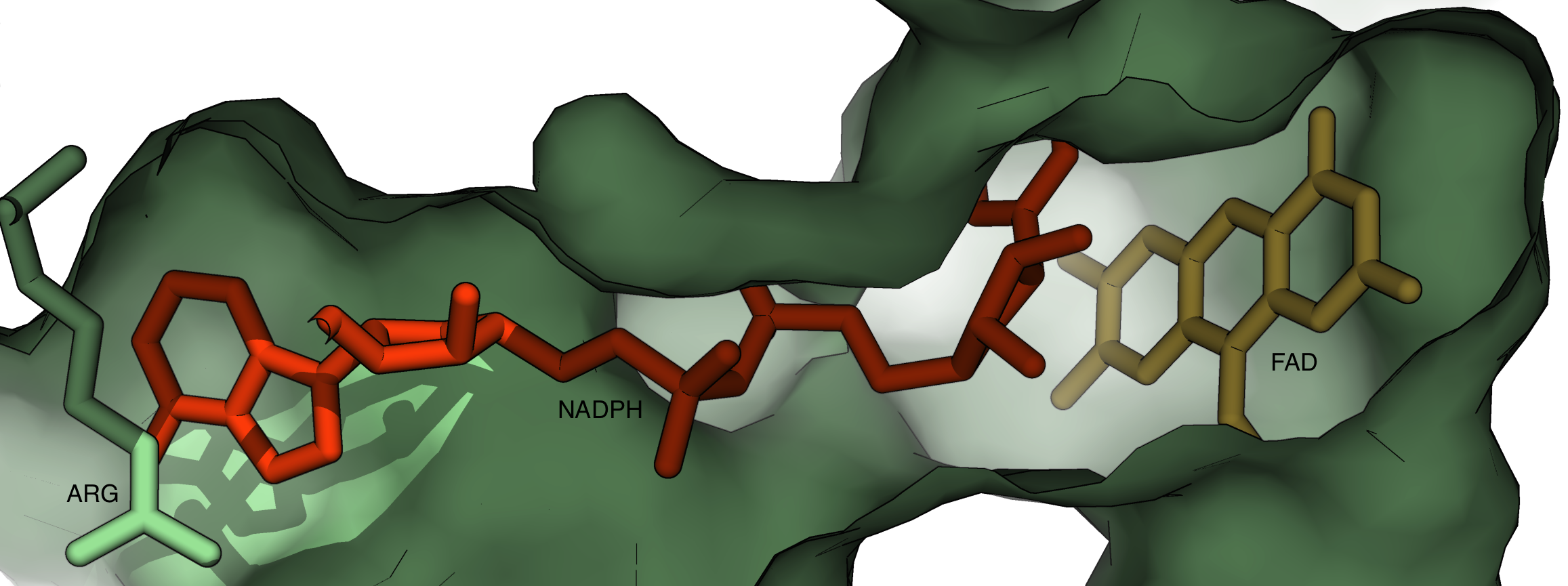
Channel and active site of bacterial FMO with bound NADPH and FAD (PDB: 2XVH).

FMOs have a tightly bound FAD prosthetic group and a binding NADPH cofactor. Both dinucleotide binding motifs form Rossmann folds. The yeast FMO and bacterial FMO are dimers, with each monomer consisting of two structural domains: the smaller NADPH binding domain and the larger FAD-binding domain. The two domains are connected by a double linker. A channel between the two domains leads to the active site where NADPH binds both domains and occupies a cleft that blocks access to the flavin group of FAD, which is bound to the large domain along the channel together with a water molecule. The nicotinamide group of NADPH interacts with the flavin group of FAD, and the NADPH binding site overlaps with the substrate binding site on the flavin group.

FMOs contain several sequence motifs that are conserved across all domains:

- FAD-binding motif (GXGXXG)
- FMO identifying motif (FXGXXXHXXXF/Y)
- NADPH-binding motif (GXSXXA)
- F/LATGY motif
- arginine residue in the active site

The FMO identifying motif interacts with the flavin of FAD. The F/LATGY motif is a sequence motif common in N-hydroxylating enzymes. The arginine residue interacts with the phosphate group of NADPH.

== Function ==
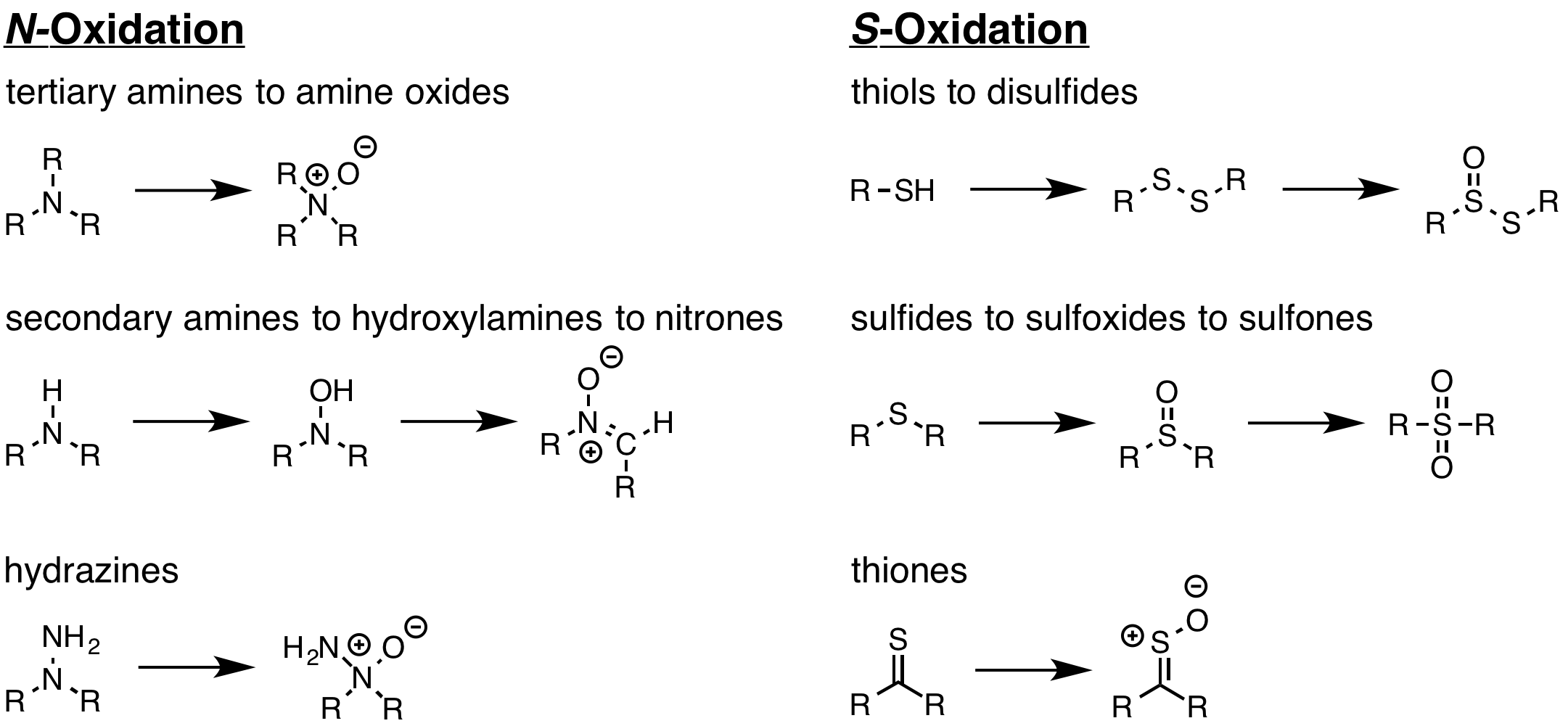
Reactions catalyzed by FMOs.

The general function of these enzymes is to metabolise xenobiotics. Hence, they are considered to be xenobiotic detoxication catalysts. These proteins catalyze the oxygenation of multiple heteroatom-containing compounds that are present in our diet, such as amine-, sulfide-, phosphorus-, and other nucleophilic heteroatom-containing compounds. FMOs have been implicated in the metabolism of a number of pharmaceuticals, pesticides and toxicants, by converting the lipophilic xenobiotics into polar, oxygenated, and readily excreted metabolites.

=== Substrate diversity ===
FMO substrates are structurally diverse compounds. However, they all share similar characteristics:

- Soft nucleophiles (basic amines, sulfides, Se- or P-containing compounds)
- Neutral or single-positively charged

Zwitterions, anions and dications are considered to be unfavorable substrates. There are several drugs reported to be typical substrates for FMOs.

Typical drug substrates
Albendazole	Clindamycin	Pargyline
Benzydamine	Fenbendazole	Ranitidine
Chlorpheniramine	Itopride	Thioridazine
Cimetidine	Olopatadine	Sulindac sulfide
Xanomeline	Zimeldine	

The majority of drugs function as alternate substrate competitive inhibitors to FMOs (i.e. good nucleophiles that compete with the drug for FMO oxygenation), since they are not likely to serve as FMO substrates. Only a few true FMO competitive inhibitors have been reported. Those include indole-3-carbinol and N,N-dimethylamino stilbene carboxylates. A well-known FMO inhibitor is methimazole (MMI).

== Mechanism ==
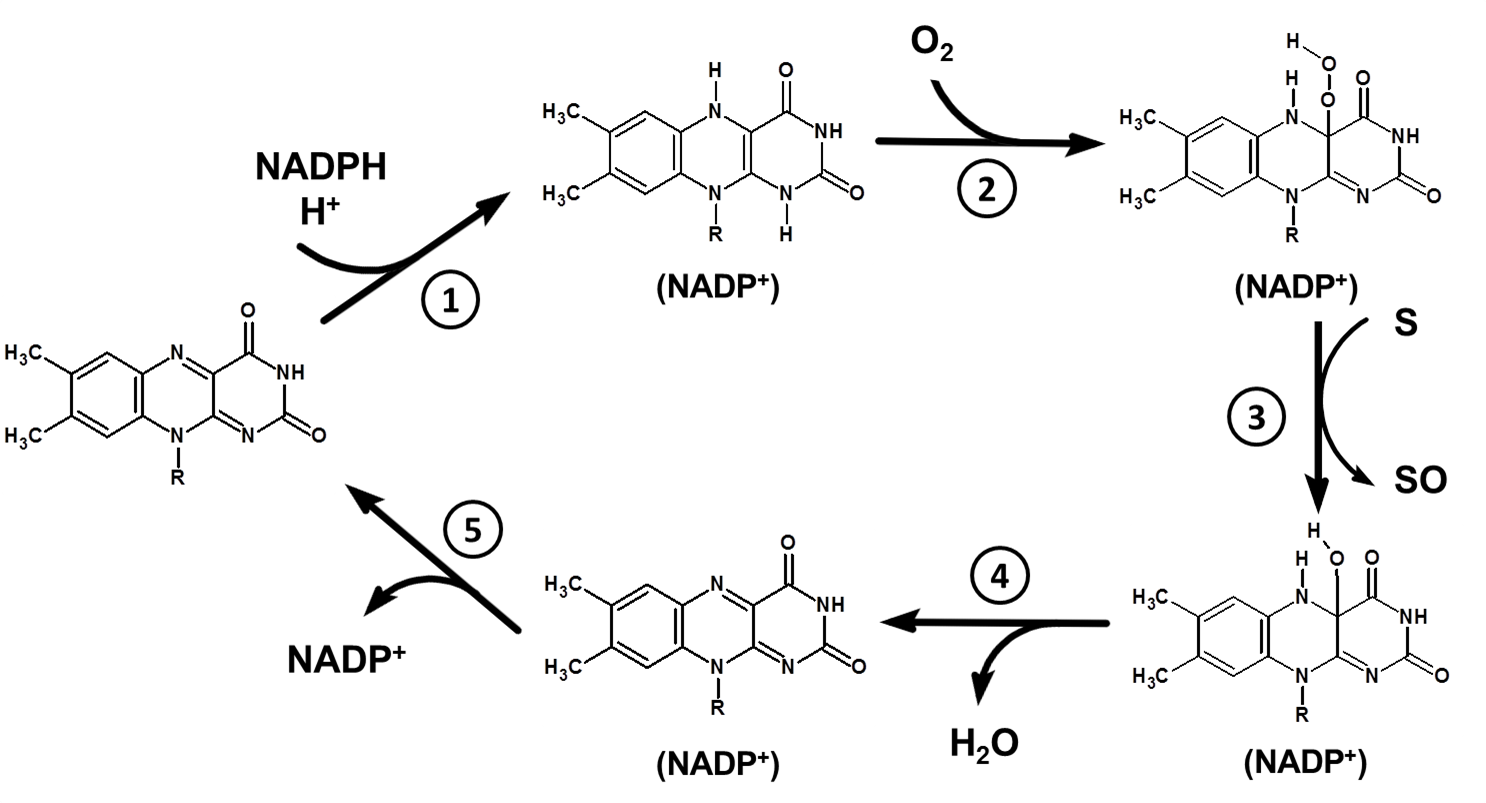
Catalytic cycle of FMOs together with the redox state of the FAD prosthetic group.

The FMO catalytic cycle proceeds as follows:

1. The cofactor NADPH binds to the oxidized state of the FAD prosthetic group, reducing it to FADH_{2}.
2. Molecular oxygen binds to the formed NADP^{+}-FADH_{2}-enzyme complex and is reduced, resulting in 4a-hydroperoxyflavin (4a-HPF or FADH-OOH). This species is stabilized by NADP^{+} in the catalytic site of the enzyme. These first two steps in the cycle are fast.
3. In the presence of a substrate (S), a nucleophilic attack occurs on the distal O-atom of the prosthetic group. The substrate is oxygenated to SO, forming the 4a-hydroxyflavin (FADH-OH). Only when the flavin is in the hydroperoxy form is when the xenobiotic substrate will react.
4. The flavin product then breaks down with release of water to reform FAD.
5. Due to the low dissociation constant of the NADP^{+}-enzyme complex, NADP^{+} is released by the end of the cycle and the enzyme returns to its original state. The rate-limiting step involves either the breakdown of FADH-OH to water or the release of NADP^{+}.
6. Quantum mechanics simulations showed the N-hydroxylation catalyzed by flavin-containing monooxygenases initiated by homolysis of the O-O bond in the C4a-hydroperoxyflavin intermediate resulting in the formation of an internal hydrogen bonded hydroxyl radical.

== Cellular expression in humans ==
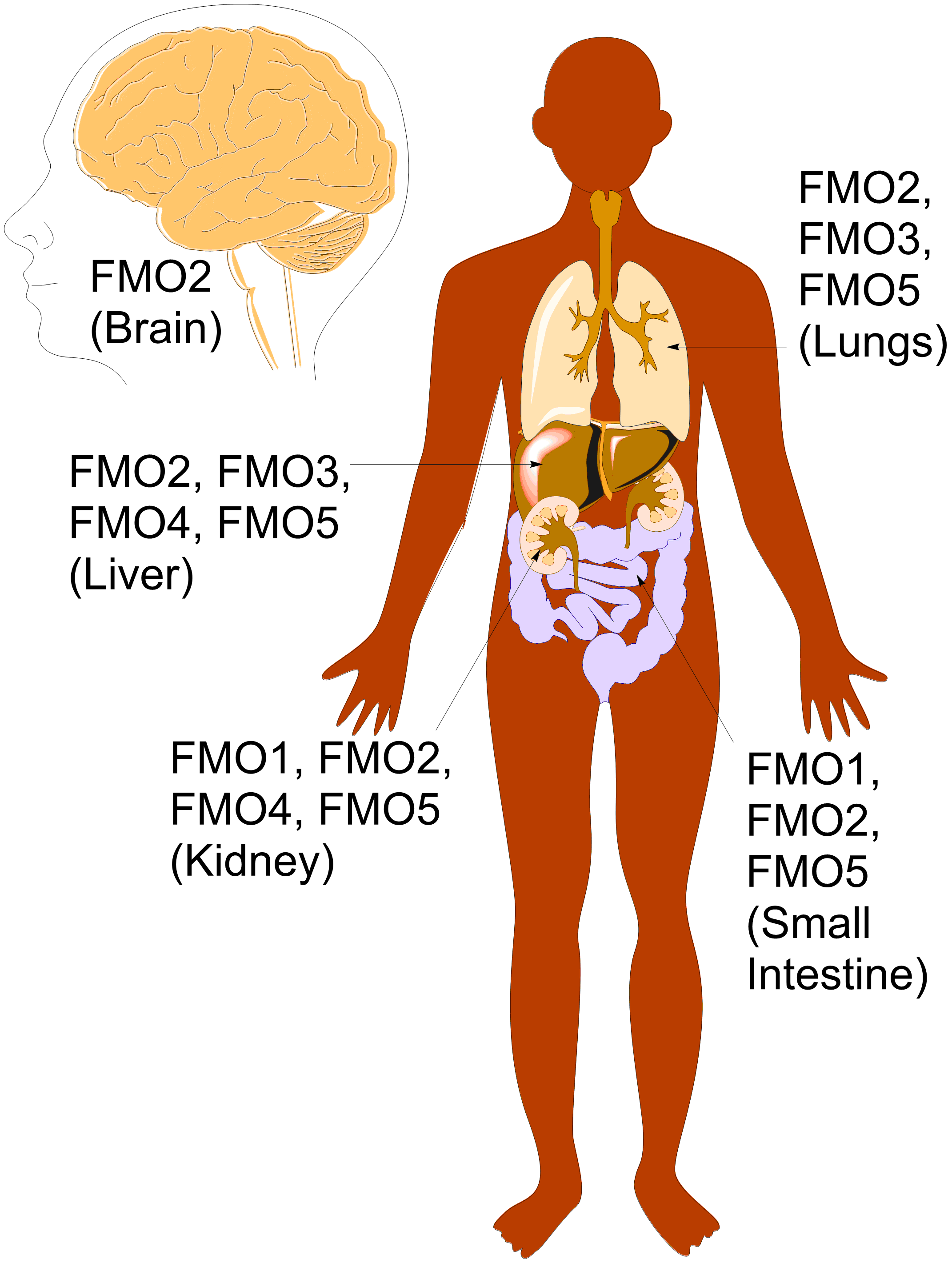
Main distributions of different types of Flavin-containing Monooxygenases (FMO) in adult human tissues.

Expression of each type of FMO relies on several factors including, cofactor supply, physiological & environmental factors, as well as diet. Because of these factors, each type of FMO is expressed differently depending on the species and tissue. In humans, expression of FMO's is mainly concentrated to the human liver, lungs, and kidneys, where most of the metabolism of xenobiotics occur. However, FMO's can also be found in the human brain and small intestine. While FMO1-5 can be found in the brain, liver, kidneys, lungs, and small intestine, the distribution of each type of FMO differs depending on the tissue and the developmental stage of the person.

=== Expression in adult tissues ===
In an adult, FMO1 is predominately expressed in the kidneys and to a lesser extent in the lungs and small intestine. FMO2 is the most abundant of the FMO's and is mostly expressed in the lungs and kidneys, with lower expression in the liver and small intestine. FMO3 is highly concentrated in the liver, but is also expressed in the lungs. FMO4 is expressed mostly in the liver and kidneys. FMO5 is highly expressed in the liver, but also has substantial expression in the lungs and small intestine. Though FMO2 is the most expressed FMO in the brain, it only constitutes about 1% of that found in the lungs, making FMO expression in the brain fairly low.

=== Expression in fetal Tissues ===
The distribution of FMO's in various types of tissues changes as a person continues to develop, making the fetal distribution of FMO's quite different than adult distribution of FMO's. While the adult liver is dominated by the expression of FMO3 and FMO5, the fetal liver is dominated by the expression of FMO1 and FMO5. Another difference is in the brain, where adults mostly express FMO2 and fetuses mostly express FMO1.

== Clinical significance ==
=== Drug development ===
Drug metabolism is one of the most important factors to consider when developing new drugs for therapeutic applications. The degradation rate of these new drugs in an organism's system determines the duration and intensity of their pharmacological action. During the past few years, FMOs have gained a lot of attention in drug development since these enzymes are not readily induced or inhibited by the chemicals or drugs surrounding their environment. CYPs are the primary enzymes involved in drug metabolism. However, recent efforts have been directed towards the development of drug candidates that incorporate functional groups that can be metabolized by FMOs. By doing this, the number of potential adverse drug-drug interactions is minimized and the reliance on CYP450 metabolism is decreased. Several approaches have been made to screen potential drug interactions. One of them includes human FMO3 (hFMO3), which is described as the most vital FMO regarding drug interactions. In order to successfully screen hFMO3 in a high throughput fashion hFMO3 was successfully fixed to graphene oxide chips in order to measure the change in electrical potential generated as a result of the drug being oxidized when it interacts with the enzyme.

=== Hypertension ===
There is evidence that FMOs are associated to the regulation of blood pressure. FMO3 is involved in the formation of TMA N-oxides (TMAO). Some studies indicate that hypertension can develop when there are no organic osmolytes (i.e. TMAO) that can counteract an increase in osmotic pressure and peripheral resistance. Individuals with deficient FMO3 activity have a higher prevalence of hypertension and other cardiovascular diseases, since there is a decrease in formation of TMA N-oxides to counterbalance the effects of a higher osmotic pressure and peripheral resistance.

=== Fish odor syndrome ===
The trimethylaminuria disorder, also known as fish odor syndrome, causes abnormal FMO3-mediated metabolism or a deficiency of this enzyme in an individual. A person with this disorder has a low capacity to oxidize the trimethylamine (TMA) that comes from their diet to its odourless metabolite TMAO. When this happens, large amounts of TMA are excreted through the individual's urine, sweat, and breath, with a strong fish-like odor. As of today, there is no known cure or treatment for this disorder. However, doctors recommend patients to avoid foods containing choline, carnitine, nitrogen, sulfur and lecithin.

=== Other diseases ===
FMOs have also been associated with other diseases, such as cancer and diabetes. Yet, additional studies are imperative to elucidate what is the relationship between FMO function and these diseases, as well as to define these enzymes’ clinical relevance.
