= Flavin-containing monooxygenase 3 =

Protein found in humans

FMO3

Identifiers
- Aliases: FMO3, trimethylamine monooxygenase, flavin-containing monooxygenase 3, Dimethylaniline monooxygenase [N-oxide-forming] 3, FMOII, TMAU, dJ127D3.1, flavin containing monooxygenase 3, flavin containing dimethylaniline monoxygenase 3
- External IDs: OMIM: 136132; MGI: 1100496; GeneCards: FMO3
Enzyme activity
EC #	BRENDA	ExPASy	KEGG	MetaCyc
1.14.13.8	↗	↗	↗	↗
1.14.13.32	↗	↗	↗	↗
1.14.13.148	↗	↗	↗	↗

Gene location (Human)
Chr.	Chromosome 1 (human)
Band	1q24.3	Start	171,090,901 bp
Band	1q24.3	End	171,117,819 bp

Gene location (Mouse)
Chr.	Chromosome 1 (mouse)
Band	1 H2.1|1 70.34 cM	Start	162,781,369 bp
Band	1 H2.1|1 70.34 cM	End	162,812,097 bp
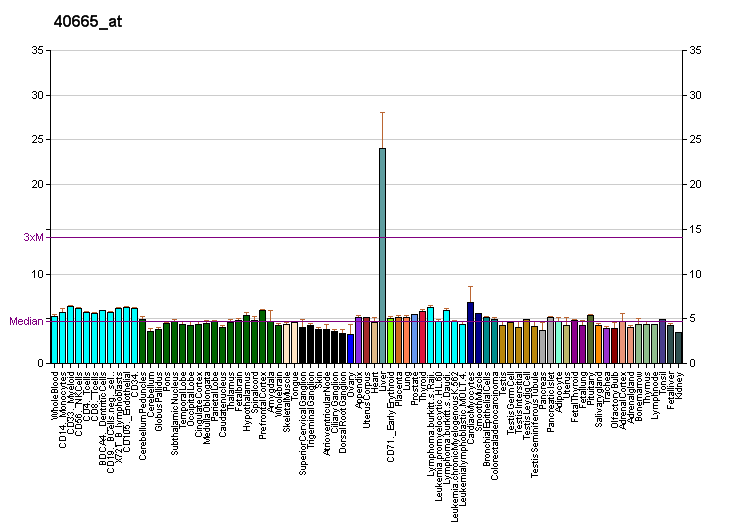

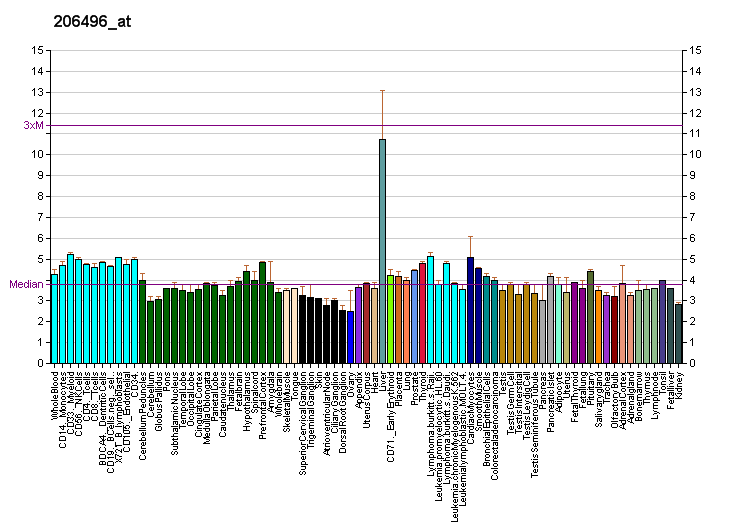
RNA expression pattern
Bgee	Human / Mouse (ortholog); Top expressed in: right lobe of liver; olfactory zone of nasal mucosa; nasal epithelium; right lung; mucosa of paranasal sinus; subcutaneous adipose tissue; bronchial epithelial cell; upper lobe of left lung; right uterine tube; testicle / Top expressed in: right lung lobe; tunica media of zone of aorta; trachea; superior surface of tongue; olfactory epithelium; ascending aorta; aortic valve; zygote; carotid body; lacrimal gland; More reference expression data
BioGPS	More reference expression data
Gene ontology
Molecular function	trimethylamine monooxygenase activity; oxidoreductase activity; N,N-dimethylaniline monooxygenase activity; NADP binding; flavin adenine dinucleotide binding; monooxygenase activity; protein binding
Cellular component	integral component of membrane; organelle membrane; endoplasmic reticulum membrane; intracellular membrane-bounded organelle; endoplasmic reticulum; membrane
Biological process	xenobiotic metabolic process
Sources:Amigo / QuickGO
Orthologs
Databases	NCBI: entry; OMA: entry
Species	Human	Mouse
Entrez	2328	14262
Ensembl	ENSG00000007933	ENSMUSG00000026691
UniProt	P31513	P97501
RefSeq (mRNA)	NM_001002294; NM_006894; NM_001319173; NM_001319174	NM_008030
RefSeq (protein)	NP_001002294; NP_001306102; NP_001306103; NP_008825	NP_032056
Location (UCSC)	Chr 1: 171.09 – 171.12 Mb	Chr 1: 162.78 – 162.81 Mb
PubMed search
- Wikidata
View/Edit Human	View/Edit Mouse

Flavin-containing monooxygenase 3 (FMO3), also known as dimethylaniline monooxygenase [N-oxide-forming] 3 and trimethylamine monooxygenase, is a flavoprotein enzyme (EC 1.14.13.148) that in humans is encoded by the FMO3 gene. This enzyme catalyzes the following chemical reaction, among others:

trimethylamine
+ NADPH
O_{2} + H^{+}
H_{2}O
trimethylamine N-oxide
+ NADP^{+}

FMO3 is the main flavin-containing monooxygenase isoenzyme that is expressed in the liver of adult humans. The human FMO3 enzyme catalyzes several types of reactions, including: the N-oxygenation of primary, secondary, and tertiary amines; the S-oxygenation of nucleophilic sulfur-containing compounds; and the 6-methylhydroxylation of the anti-cancer agent dimethylxanthenone acetic acid (DMXAA).

FMO3 is the primary enzyme in humans which catalyzes the N-oxidation of trimethylamine into trimethylamine N-oxide; FMO1 also does this, but to a much lesser extent than FMO3. Genetic deficiencies of the FMO3 enzyme cause primary trimethylaminuria, also known as "fish odor syndrome". FMO3 is also involved in the metabolism of many xenobiotics (i.e., exogenous compounds which are not normally present in the body), such as the oxidative deamination of amphetamine.

== Ligands ==
List of human FMO3 substrates, inhibitors, inducers, and activators
FMO3 substrates	FMO3 inhibitors	FMO3 inducers	FMO3 activators
Endogenous biomolecules: Epinephrine; Norepinephrine; Phenethylamine^{†}; Trimethylamine^{†}; Tyramine; Notable exogenous xenobiotics: Amphetamine^{†} and its hydroxylamine intermediate; Benzydamine; Cimetidine; Clozapine; N-Deacetyl ketoconazole; DMXAA^{†}; Ethionamide; Itopride; Methamphetamine and its hydroxylamine intermediate; Methimazole; Nicotine – only the (S)-(−)-nicotine enantiomer; Olopatadine; Phenothiazines – 2-(Trifluoromethyl) analogs; Ranitidine; Sulindac sulfide; Tamoxifen; Thiobenzamide; Xanomeline	Thiourea; Indole-3-carbinol		Chlorpromazine; Imipramine
A ^{†} indicates moderate to complete selectivity for FMO3 relative to other FMO isoenzymes.

== Cancer ==
The FMO3 gene has been observed progressively downregulated in human papillomavirus-positive neoplastic keratinocytes derived from uterine cervical preneoplastic lesions at different levels of malignancy. For this reason, FMO3 is likely to be associated with tumorigenesis and may be a potential prognostic marker for progression of uterine cervical preneoplastic lesions.
