= Flavin containing monooxygenase 1 =

Protein found in humans

FMO1

Identifiers
- Aliases: FMO1, flavin containing monooxygenase 1, flavin containing dimethylaniline monoxygenase 1
- External IDs: OMIM: 136130; MGI: 1310002; GeneCards: FMO1
Enzyme activity
EC #	BRENDA	ExPASy	KEGG	MetaCyc
1.14.13.8	↗	↗	↗	↗
1.14.13.148	↗	↗	↗	↗

Gene location (Human)
Chr.	Chromosome 1 (human)
Band	1q24.3	Start	171,248,471 bp
Band	1q24.3	End	171,285,978 bp

Gene location (Mouse)
Chr.	Chromosome 1 (mouse)
Band	1 H2.1|1 70.34 cM	Start	162,657,130 bp
Band	1 H2.1|1 70.34 cM	End	162,694,179 bp
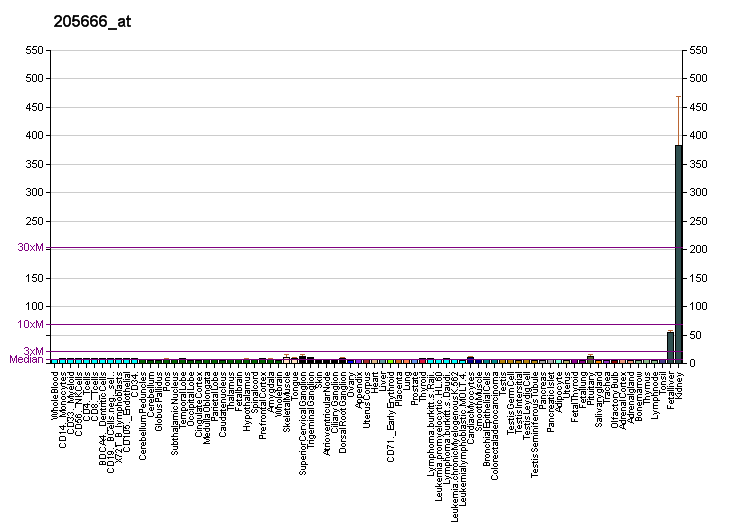
RNA expression pattern
Bgee	Human / Mouse (ortholog); Top expressed in: kidney tubule; glomerulus; metanephric glomerulus; human kidney; mucosa of ileum; parietal pleura; mucosa of paranasal sinus; renal medulla; oral cavity; skin of thigh / Top expressed in: right kidney; human kidney; yolk sac; gastrula; proximal tubule; right lung; tunica adventitia of aorta; brown adipose tissue; right lung lobe; cardiac muscle tissue of left ventricle; More reference expression data
BioGPS	More reference expression data
Gene ontology
Molecular function	oxidoreductase activity; N,N-dimethylaniline monooxygenase activity; NADP binding; flavin adenine dinucleotide binding; monooxygenase activity; protein binding
Cellular component	organelle membrane; integral component of membrane; endoplasmic reticulum lumen; endoplasmic reticulum membrane; endoplasmic reticulum; membrane; intracellular membrane-bounded organelle
Biological process	response to osmotic stress; xenobiotic metabolic process; toxin metabolic process; response to lipopolysaccharide; NADPH oxidation; organic acid metabolic process
Sources:Amigo / QuickGO
Orthologs
Databases	NCBI: entry; OMA: entry
Species	Human	Mouse
Entrez	2326	14261
Ensembl	ENSG00000010932	ENSMUSG00000040181
UniProt	Q01740	P50285
RefSeq (mRNA)	NM_001282692; NM_001282693; NM_001282694; NM_002021	NM_010231; NM_001330291; NM_001330318
RefSeq (protein)	NP_001269621; NP_001269622; NP_001269623; NP_002012	NP_001317220; NP_001317247; NP_034361
Location (UCSC)	Chr 1: 171.25 – 171.29 Mb	Chr 1: 162.66 – 162.69 Mb
PubMed search
- Wikidata
View/Edit Human	View/Edit Mouse

Dimethylaniline monooxygenase [N-oxide-forming] 1 is an enzyme that in humans is encoded by the FMO1 gene.

Metabolic N-oxidation of the diet-derived amino-trimethylamine (TMA) is mediated by flavin-containing monooxygenase and is subject to an inherited FMO3 polymorphism in humans resulting in a small subpopulation with reduced TMA N-oxidation capacity resulting in fish odor syndrome Trimethylaminuria. Three forms of the enzyme, FMO1 found in fetal liver, FMO2 found in adult liver, and FMO3 are encoded by genes clustered in the 1q23-q25 region. Flavin-containing monooxygenases are NADPH-dependent flavoenzymes that catalyzes the oxidation of soft nucleophilic heteroatom centers in xenobiotics such as pesticides and drugs.
