= Kaveh Shojania =

Canadian doctor, academic

Kaveh G. Shojania
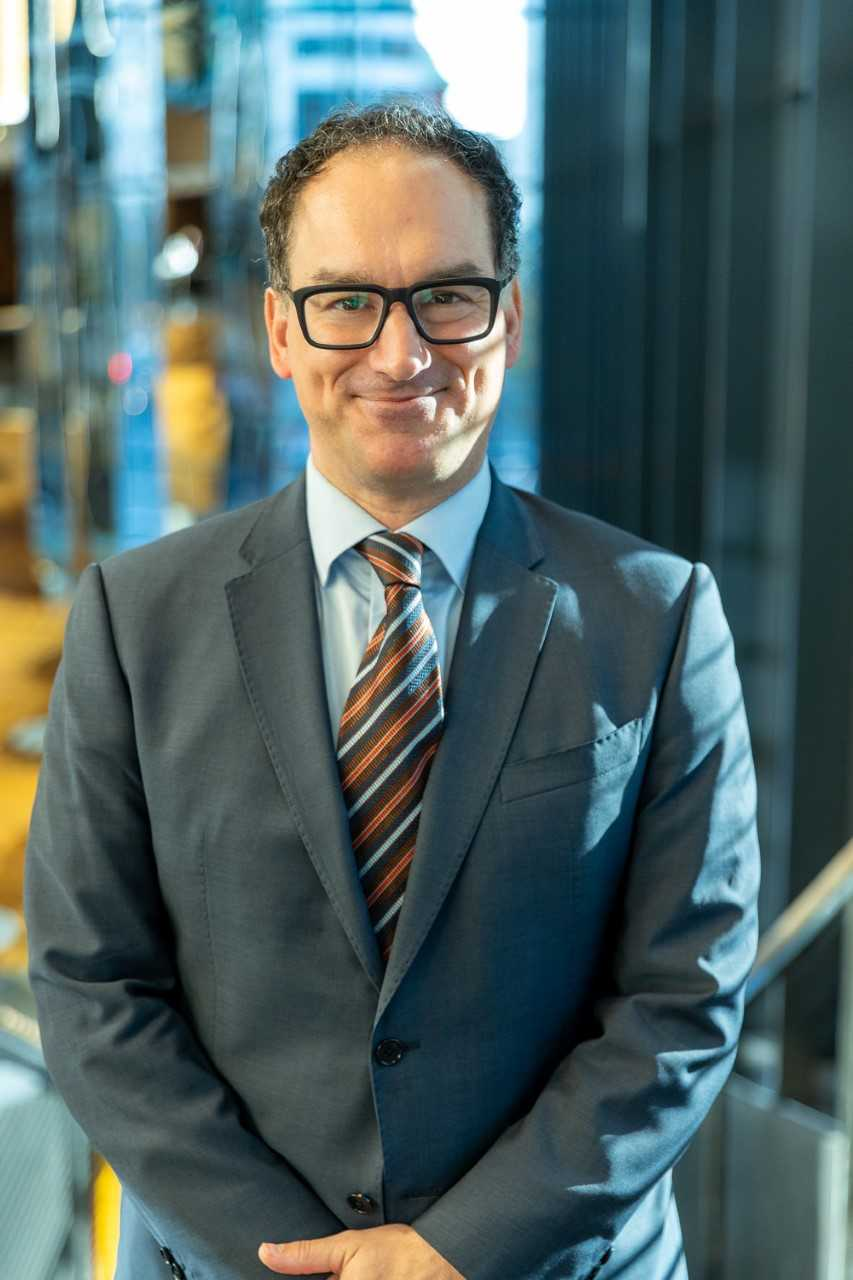
- Occupations: Doctor, academic and an author
- Awards: John M. Eisenberg Patient Safety Award, National Quality Forum and the Joint Commission on Accreditation of Healthcare Organizations (2004)

Academic background
- Education: BSc, Biochemistry; Doctor of Medicine
- Alma mater: University of Manitoba; University of British Columbia; Harvard University; University of California, San Francisco

Academic work
- Institutions: University of Toronto; Sunnybrook Health Sciences Centre

Kaveh G. Shojania is a Canadian doctor, academic and an author. He is the vice chair of quality & innovation in the department of medicine at the University of Toronto as well as staff physician at the Sunnybrook Health Sciences Centre.

Shojania is most known for his works on evidence synthesis, patient safety strategies and health quality improvement. Among his authored works are his publications in academic journals, including the Journal of the American Medical Association and New England Journal of Medicine as well as a book titled Internal Bleeding: The Truth Behind America's Terrifying Epidemic of Medical Mistakes. Moreover, he is the recipient of 2004 John M. Eisenberg Patient Safety Award from the National Quality Forum and the Joint Commission on Accreditation of Healthcare Organizations.

== Education ==
Shojania completed his BSc Honors in Biochemistry from the University of Manitoba in 1990, followed by a Doctor of Medicine degree from the same institution in 1994. Between 1994 and 1995, he completed an internship in internal medicine at the University of British Columbia, followed by a medical residency at Brigham and Women's Hospital (Harvard University) in Boston. From 1998 to 2000, he was the first fellow in Hospital Medicine at the University of California, San Francisco (UCSF), working with Robert M. Wachter, who coined the term 'hospitalist' in a paper in the New England Journal of Medicine two years earlier. Shojania was the first such hospitalist fellow in the US.

== Career ==
Shojania initiated his academic career at the University of California, San Francisco. He held various positions at UCSF, beginning as a clinical instructor from 1998 to 2000 and later serving as an assistant professor of medicine from 2000 to 2004. Subsequently, he transitioned to the University of Ottawa, initially as an assistant professor from 2004 to 2007 and later as an associate professor from 2007 to 2008. From 2009 to 2021, he was an adjunct faculty member of the Dalla Lana School of Public Health at the University of Toronto.

Between 2009 and 2019, Shojania served as the director of Centre for Quality Improvement and Patient Safety at the University of Toronto, where he developed education and training programs for healthcare professionals interested in improving the quality of healthcare delivery. Since 2015, he has been a Vice Chair of quality & innovation in the Department of Medicine at the University of Toronto.

Shojania worked as the scientist in the clinical epidemiology program at the Ottawa Health Research Institute from 2004 to 2008. In 2011, he became Editor-in-Chief of BMJ Quality & Safety, later co-Editor-in-Chief with Mary Dixon-Woods of Cambridge University. Since 2020, he has held the position of emeritus editor at the journal. He has served as a staff physician at Sunnybrook Health Sciences Centre since 2008.

== Works ==
Focusing on effective patient safety strategies, Shojania authored the book Internal Bleeding: The Truth Behind America's Terrifying Epidemic of Medical Mistakes. This book dealt with the concerning frequency of errors in contemporary healthcare and the need for immediate reforms to mitigate risks and safeguard patients from harm.

In his New York Times review Barron H. Lerner wrote "Internal Bleeding is an erudite, readable and well-argued book. The authors describe the origins of the patient safety movement, which has drawn from a number of fields outside medicine – most notably, the aircraft industry." He further commended author's efforts for effectively advocating the establishment of a "safety culture" using a systematic approach.

== Research ==
Shojania has authored publications spanning the fields of patient safety and health quality improvement. Google Scholar lists over 24,000 citations to his work. The initial stage of his research career coincided with the launch of the patient safety movement and subsequent attention to healthcare quality more broadly. Many of the prominent figures advancing this important movement within healthcare advocated adopting strategies from other high-risk industries, such as commercial aviation and nuclear power. They also advocated adopting intuitively appealing but unproven healthcare interventions. Shojania's early contributions amounted to adopting an 'evidence-based medicine' as in the rest of biomedicine, namely to test these interventions in rigorous research, such as randomized controlled trials. He published commentaries advocating this approach for patient safety in the Journal of the American Medical Association and the New England Journal of Medicine, among other publications.

His work in evidence synthesis related to interventions designed to improve healthcare delivery has tended to highlight the degree to which promising interventions often turn out to have disappointingly small effects when evaluated rigorously. In his 2006 meta-analysis of 60+ studies on diabetes care improvement, it was revealed that most strategies had only small to modest effects, Interventions with non-physician case managers adjusting medications without physician authorization showed significant and robust glycemic control improvements in adults with type 2 diabetes. But, a large number of ongoing trials in this area led to a significantly revised analysis, published in the Lancet in 2012, which showed that all of the strategies tended to deliver small improvements.

Similarly, while investigating the impact of Computerized Physician Order Entry (CPOE) and Clinical Decision Support Systems (CDSSs) meta-analysis of 108 studies again revealed small improvements in the care patients received. In related research, he conducted a systematic review and meta-analysis of 108 studies, revealing small to moderate improvements with substantial heterogeneity, and exploring factors influencing the effectiveness of CDSS interventions in diverse clinical settings.

Focusing on diagnostic errors, Shojania's systematic review of 53 autopsy series over 40 years revealed a relative decrease in diagnostic error rates, indicating major errors in 23.5% of cases and class I errors in 9.0%, suggesting that while the likelihood of uncovering clinically missed diagnoses has diminished, contemporary institutions may still experience major error rates ranging from 8.4% to 24.4% and class I error rates from 4.1% to 6.7%. His 2011 work systematically reviewed and ranked patient safety practices, identifying 11 interventions with strong supporting evidence, primarily focusing on clinical interventions related to hospitalization, critical care, and surgery, while emphasizing the need for further research to address gaps in evidence and explore practices from non-health care industries. Moreover, his article addressed the challenge of outdated systematic reviews in healthcare, revealing that 23% of reviews were obsolete within 2 years, emphasizing the need for timely updates to ensure the currency and accuracy of evidence-based practices.

In a series of commentaries and methodological publications, Shojania has examined the relationship between healthcare quality and environmental sustainability. In a 2022 editorial published in the Canadian Medical Association Journal, he questioned how the healthcare quality movement should prioritize its efforts amid global challenges such as climate change, arguing that quality improvement should engage more directly with issues affecting public health beyond conventional measures of healthcare performance. He expanded this argument in a 2024 article in BMJ Quality & Safety, where he examined the environmental impact of healthcare systems and evaluated the role of quality improvement initiatives in reducing healthcare's carbon footprint. These publications contributed to growing discussion within healthcare quality scholarship regarding the integration of environmental sustainability into health system improvement. Shojania has also contributed to the development of quality improvement as an academic discipline. In 2009, he co-authored, with Wendy Levinson, a commentary in the Journal of the American Medical Association (JAMA) proposing a dedicated academic career pathway for physicians specializing in quality improvement. The article outlined a model for integrating quality improvement and patient safety into academic medicine and subsequently informed the establishment of the University of Toronto's Clinician in Quality and Innovation pathway, one of the earliest formal academic programs of its kind. A decade after the pathway's introduction, Shojania co-authored a qualitative study published in the American Journal of Medical Quality in 2025 evaluating its first ten years. The study examined the career development of physicians participating in the program and assessed the opportunities and challenges associated with this novel academic pathway, contributing to the literature on the institutional development of quality improvement and implementation science as academic fields.

=== SQUIRE (Standards for Quality Improvement Reporting Excellence) ===
Another focus of Shojania's recent work has been improving the methodological quality and reporting standards of healthcare improvement research. He has served as co-lead of the revision of the SQUIRE (Standards for Quality Improvement Reporting Excellence) guidelines, the internationally recognized reporting framework for quality improvement studies. Originally introduced in 2008 and subsequently revised in 2015, the SQUIRE guidelines provide standardized recommendations for the transparent reporting of healthcare quality improvement initiatives. The updated revision seeks to reflect methodological advances in implementation science, systems improvement, and healthcare evaluation while maintaining internationally accepted standards for reporting quality improvement research.

== Awards and honors ==
- 2002 – Hellman Family Award for Early Career Faculty, University of California San Francisco
- 2002 – Young Investigator Award, Society for Hospital Medicine
- 2004 – John M. Eisenberg Patient Safety Award from the National Quality Forum and the Joint Commission on Accreditation of Healthcare Organizations
- 2005–2008 – Canada Research Chairs Program Award, University of Ottawa
- 2010 – Excellence in Continuing Education Award, Sunnybrook Health Sciences Centre
- 2008–2013 – Canada Research Chairs Program Award, Sunnybrook Health Science Centre/University of Toronto
- 2014 – Senior Investigator Award, Sunnybrook Health Sciences Centre

== Bibliography ==
=== Books ===
- Internal Bleeding: The Truth Behind America's Terrifying Epidemic of Medical Mistakes (2005) ISBN 9781590710739

=== Selected articles ===
- Shojania, K. G., Duncan, B. W., McDonald, K. M., Wachter, R. M., & Markowitz, A. J. (2001). Making health care safer: a critical analysis of patient safety practices. Evidence report/technology assessment (Summary), (43), i–x.
- Shojania, K. G., Duncan, B. W., McDonald, K. M., & Wachter, R. M. (2002). Safe but sound: patient safety meets evidence-based medicine. Jama, 288(4), 508–513.
- Shojania, K. G., Burton, E. C., McDonald, K. M., & Goldman, L. (2003). Changes in rates of autopsy-detected diagnostic errors over time: a systematic review. Jama, 289(21), 2849–2856.
- Shojania, K. G., Ranji, S. R., McDonald, K. M., Grimshaw, J. M., Sundaram, V., Rushakoff, R. J., & Owens, D. K. (2006). Effects of quality improvement strategies for type 2 diabetes on glycemic control: a meta-regression analysis. Jama, 296(4), 427–440.
- Auerbach, A. D., Landefeld, C. S., & Shojania, K. G. (2007). The tension between needing to improve care and knowing how to do it. The New England journal of medicine, 357(6), 608.
- Shojania, K. G., Sampson, M., Ansari, M. T., Ji, J., Doucette, S., & Moher, D. (2007). How quickly do systematic reviews go out of date? A survival analysis. Annals of internal medicine, 147(4), 224–233.
