= Obstetric hospitalist =

Medical profession

Obstetric Hospitalist
Occupation
- Names: Physician; Surgeon
- Occupation type: Specialty
- Activity sectors: Medicine, Surgery

Description
- Education required: Doctor of Medicine (M.D.); Doctor of Osteopathic medicine (D.O.); Bachelor of Medicine, Bachelor of Surgery (M.B.B.S.); Bachelor of Medicine, Bachelor of Surgery (MBChB)
- Fields of employment: Hospitals, Clinics

An obstetric hospitalist (Ob hospitalist or OB/GYN hospitalist) is an obstetrician and gynecologist physician who is either employed by a hospital or a staffing company and whose duties include providing care for laboring patients and managing obstetric emergencies. Some obstetrics hospitalists also have responsibilities including resident and medical student teaching; providing backup support for family practitioners and nurse midwives, assisting private physicians with surgery, assuming care for ob-gyn patients unassigned to a physician and providing vacation coverage for the private practicing physician.

The first known obstetrics hospitalist program started in 1989 at Alta Bates Medical Center in Berkeley, California. The number of obstetric hospitalist programs grew exponentially over the subsequent years, increasing from 61 known programs in 2009 to over 245 programs in 2016.

== History ==
The term "hospitalist" was first used in a 1996 New England Journal of Medicine article by Robert Wachter and Lee Goldman. They described a "new breed" of inpatient medical specialist who would be responsible for management of hospital patients. The hospitalists are typically physicians who spend more than 25% of their time caring for hospitalized patients. They have the responsibility for a patient's in-hospital care, similar to the way that primary care physicians are responsible for outpatient care. Wachter & Goodman theorized that doctors who practiced inpatient medicine exclusively would provide care that was more efficient, of better quality, at a lower cost, and ultimately would provide better value for patients.

Since the mid-1990s, the hospitalist movement has experienced significant growth. In 2012, more than 30,000 hospitalists were staffed at 70% of the hospitals in the US. Originally, the hospitalist community was primarily made up of general internists, family physicians and pediatricians. Specialty-care hospitalists soon followed, including neurologists (neurohospitalists), surgeons (surgicalists), psychiatric hospitalists, orthopedic hospitalists, dermatology hospitalists and obstetricians (termed laboriousts, ob hospitalists or obgyn hospitalists).

The term laborioust was coined in an article written in 2002 by Louis Weinstein, MD in the American Journal of Obstetrics and Gynecology. Weinstein focused on the demands obstetricians face every day; from their offices, multiple telephone calls and patients in the hospital. In the article he wrote, "To improve the survivability and well-being of the obstetrician, I propose a new focus of practice for the practitioner, to be called the laborist. The laborist position is perfect for the individual who desires to practice obstetrics but who wishes to avoid the aspects of an office practice. This individual is available on the delivery floor to provide prompt, continuous, and efficient care to the laboring patient or to the patient who needs evaluation for an obstetric problem."

== Roles ==
The main function of the obstetrics hospitalists is to intercede as needed to ensure patient safety and quality care in the labor and delivery unit. The scope of care can extend to the antepartum, postpartum, and emergency units. Specific roles of the obstetric hospitalist include inpatient consultations, triaging patients for private physicians, monitoring laboring patients, providing care as required, and responding to precipitous deliveries and emergencies.

Obstetric hospitalist programs throughout the country have taken various forms, including programs where physicians on the medical staff voluntarily take 12- or 24-hour shifts to provide continuous coverage for their labor and delivery unit. One such program was developed in response to a hospital requirement that physicians be present during the first 30 minutes after an epidural has been placed. Relieving the medical staff of this responsibility, as well as having a physician present and available to respond to patient emergencies, was a significant physician satisfier, and far outweighed the inconvenience of having to spend the night in the hospital once a month.

Other voluntary programs provide limited labor and delivery coverage during the hours of the day or night that historically have had the greatest volume of unattended deliveries or untoward patient outcomes because physicians are not present in the hospital. Some obstetrics hospitalist programs consist of hospital-employed physicians who staff labor and delivery 24 hours a day. Hospitals now have the option of setting up a group of hospitalists under contract or working with existing corporations that provide physician staffing in various specialties or that exclusively provide obstetrics hospitalist staffing and program development.

The obstetric hospitalist specialty is further enhanced by the Society of Ob/Gyn Hospitalists. This group, established in 2011, is "dedicated to enhancing the safety and quality of obstetric and gynecologic hospital medicine by promoting excellence through education, coordination of hospital teams, and collaboration with health care delivery systems." The society members explained their origin as a response to the need for leadership, a sharper focus on patient safety and quality and increasing costs. In the February 2016 Obstetrics and Gynecology journal the society members also suggest that early research shows obstetric hospitalists improve patient safety and the quality of care in labor and delivery units.

== Patient care ==
In the traditional patient care model, nurses have been the front line in the labor and delivery unit with patients until the private physician arrives for a delivery. The physician communicates orders to the nurses when they are contacted about the patient usually via telephone. The nurse and physician generally discuss a plan of care and estimate a delivery time so the physician can come to the hospital in a timely manner. If a patient emergency occurs prior to the arrival of the physician the nurse is responsible for care of the patient. This has been the way most labor and delivery units have been managed since women began laboring and delivering in hospitals.

The arrival of the obstetrics hospitalists has changed this traditional pattern of care. In a hospital system with a full-time obstetric hospitalist program an obstetrician is available in the hospital 24 hours a day. Obstetric hospitalists are in the unique position of having more experience with obstetrical emergencies than the average private obstetrician because they are present for most of the complicated or emergency cases. This experience increases the quality of the care they provide. In this new model, pregnant patients have access to immediate obstetrical care and private obstetricians have an onsite partner who can offer second opinions and assistance with complicated or high risk cases. This model also provides the hospital staff with a physician available to offer immediate support, education and patient care. The hospital administration has a tangible system in place that directly supports quality care and patient satisfaction.

Obstetric hospitalist programs play an important role in evolving health care delivery systems that focus on strategies that increase safety and satisfaction while reducing risk and costs.
