= Kathryn McDonald =

American scientist

- Education: Stanford University; Kellogg School of Management; University of California, Berkeley
- Scientific career
- Workplaces: Stanford University; Johns Hopkins University
- Thesis: Ambulatory Care Organizations : Improving Diagnosis (2017)

Kathryn McDonald is an American scientist who is Bloomberg Distinguished Professor at the Johns Hopkins University. She serves as co-director of the Johns Hopkins Center for Diagnostic Excellence. McDonald previously led the Centre for Health Policy at Freeman Spogli Institute for International Studies. Her research considers what makes for high-quality and safe healthcare delivery systems.

== Early life and education ==
McDonald was an undergraduate student at Stanford University, where she majored in chemical engineering. She moved to the Kellogg School of Management for graduate studies, where she earned a Master of Management (MM) in 1992. She returned to Stanford University in the early 1990s, where she worked in the Medical School. McDonald eventually completed a doctorate in public health at the University of California, Berkeley in 2017. Her doctoral research looked at ambulatory care organizations and how they can help to improve the diagnosis of medical conditions. She was the member of a committee who found that the majority of United States physicians had made one faulty diagnosis. She estimated that over 12 million adults were misdiagnosed every year.

== Research and career ==
McDonald held various positions in the Stanford University School of Medicine. She founded and directed the Center for Primary Care and Outcomes Research. She develops tool measure patient safety and healthcare quality. She created healthcare quality measurements (so-called quality indicators) which collect and analyze data from hospitals. She was awarded the Society for Medical Decision Making Saenger Distinguished Service Award in 2007. She has investigated the ways that a patient's protected characteristics (including age, gender and race) contribute to errors in medical diagnoses. She has also studied how the time constraints placed on nurses and clinicians impacts patient safety.

In 2019, McDonald was appointed a Bloomberg Distinguished Professor at the Johns Hopkins University. During the COVID-19 pandemic McDonald studied healthcare worker protection and the decision-making process.

== Selected publications ==
- K G Shojania; B W Duncan; K M McDonald; R M Wachter; A J Markowitz (2001). "Making health care safer: a critical analysis of patient safety practices". Evidence report/technology assessment (Summary) (43): i-x, 1-668. ISSN 1530-440X. PMC 4781305. PMID 11510252. Wikidata Q28346232.
- Mark A. Hlatky; Derek B Boothroyd; Dena M Bravata; et al. (19 March 2009). "Coronary artery bypass surgery compared with percutaneous coronary interventions for multivessel disease: a collaborative analysis of individual patient data from ten randomised trials". The Lancet. 373 (9670): 1190–1197. doi:10.1016/s0140-6736(09)60552-3. ISSN 0140-6736. PMID 19303634. Wikidata Q33420176.
- Kaveh G Shojania; Sumant R Ranji; Kathryn M McDonald; Jeremy M Grimshaw; Vandana Sundaram; Robert J Rushakoff; Douglas K Owens (1 July 2006). "Effects of quality improvement strategies for type 2 diabetes on glycemic control: a meta-regression analysis". JAMA. 296 (4): 427–440. doi:10.1001/jama.296.4.427. ISSN 0098-7484. PMID 16868301. Wikidata Q36547032.
