= Hospital medicine =

Acute internal medicine

Hospitalist
Occupation
- Names: Physician; Surgeon
- Occupation type: Specialty
- Activity sectors: Medicine, Surgery

Description
- Education required: Doctor of Medicine (M.D.); Doctor of Osteopathic medicine (D.O.); Bachelor of Medicine, Bachelor of Surgery (M.B.B.S.); Bachelor of Medicine, Bachelor of Surgery (MBChB)
- Fields of employment: Hospitals, Clinics

Hospital medicine is a medical specialty that exists in some countries as a branch of family medicine or internal medicine, dealing with the care of acutely ill hospitalized patients. Physicians whose primary professional focus is caring for hospitalized patients only while they are in the hospital are called hospitalists. Originating in the United States, this type of medical practice has extended into Australia and Canada. The vast majority of physicians who refer to themselves as hospitalists focus their practice upon hospitalized patients. Hospitalists are not necessarily required to have separate board certification in hospital medicine.

The term hospitalist was coined by Robert Wachter and Lee Goldman in a 1996 New England Journal of Medicine article. The scope of hospital medicine includes acute patient care, teaching, research, and executive leadership related to the delivery of hospital-based care. Hospital medicine, like emergency medicine, is a specialty organized around the location of care (the hospital), rather than an organ (like cardiology), disease (like oncology), or a patient’s age (like pediatrics). The emergence of hospital medicine in the United States can be compared and contrasted with the parallel development of acute medicine in the United Kingdom, reflecting health system differences.

== Complex work practices ==
In the US, a typical hospitalist workday in the hospital lasts roughly 10 hours, arriving around 7 a.m. and taking care of a "census" of 14 to 18 patients. Hospitalists typically embrace the rhythm of a "7 on 7 off" schedule, starting each seven-day stretch on a Tuesday and ending on a Monday. While these are typical, what counts as a normal workday, census, and shift schedule can vary from hospital to hospital.

A hospitalist is like a football quarterback, a central node coordinating patient care for hospitalized inpatients for the duration of their stay. Compared to other medical specialties, hospitalists must work more closely with a much broader range of other healthcare professionals, such as specialist physicians, bedside nurses, charge nurses, pharmacists, and case managers. On a typical day in a hospital, a hospitalist is likely to have 10 to 30 different colleagues with whom they are collaborating on patient care.

When combined with the complexities of hospital medicine, complex interprofessional collaboration tends to allow for unnecessary miscommunication, oversight, errors, and delays. Attempts to reduce this complexity and standardize interprofessional collaboration have resulted in care models like interdisciplinary bedside rounds that emphasize face-to-face communication, a contrast with communication that occurs solely through the electronic medical record, secure chat, pages, and calls.

== By country ==
=== Australia ===
In Australia, hospitalists are career hospital doctors; they are generalist medical practitioners whose principal focus is the provision of clinical care to patients in hospitals; they are typically beyond the internship-residency phase of their career, but have decidedly chosen as a conscious career choice not to partake in vocational-specialist training to acquire fellowship specialist qualification. Whilst not specialists, these clinicians are nonetheless experienced in their years of medical practice, and depending on their scope of practice, they typically work with a reasonable degree of independence and autonomy under the auspices of their specialist colleagues and supervisors. Hospitalists form a demographically small but important workforce of doctors in hospitals across Australia where on-site specialist coverage is otherwise unavailable.

Hospitalists are typically employed in a variety of public and private hospital settings on a contractual or salaried basis. Dependent on their place of employment and duties, the responsibilities and remuneration of non-specialist hospitalists are usually comparable to somewhere between registrars and consultants. Despite the common trend for clinicians to specialise nowadays, non-specialist hospitalist clinicians have an important role in fulfilling shortages in the medical workforce, especially when specialist coverage or accessibility is unavailable and where there is an area-of-need or after-hours or on-site medical care is required. These clinicians and employed across Australia in a variety of environments which include Medical & Surgical Wards, Intensive Care Units and Emergency Departments. Nonetheless, these clinicians work closely and continually consult with the relevant attending specialists on-call; that is, final responsibility and care for the patient ultimately still rests with the attending specialist.

They are also known as: Career Medical Officers (CMO), Senior Medical Officers (SMO) and Multi-skilled Medical Officers (MMO).

Hospitalists are represented by the Australian Medical Association (AMA), Australasian Society of Career Medical Officers (ASCMO) and Australian Salaried Medical Officers Federation (AMSOF). Despite being non-specialist clinicians, they are still required to meet continuing professional development requirements and frequently attend courses facilitated by these organisations and hospitals to keep their practice and skill sets up-to-date alongside their specialist registered colleagues.

=== Canada ===
In Canada, there are currently no official residency programs specializing in hospital medicine. Nevertheless, some universities, such as McGill University in Montreal, have come up with family medicine enhanced skills programs focused on hospital medicine. This program, which is available to practicing physicians and family medicine residents, has a duration of six or twelve months. The main goal behind the program is to prepare medical doctors with training in family practice to assume shared care roles with other specialists, such as cardiologists, neurologists, and nephrologists, in a hospital setting. Moreover, the program prepares family physicians by giving them a set of skills required for caring for their complicated hospitalized patients.

=== France ===
In France, it is not directly accessible after the internship exam, but via additional degrees. It has been accessible via a Specialized Cross-disciplinary Training Program since 2023. The practice is organized through the "Société Française de Médecine Polyvalente" (French Society of Hospital Medicine) founded in 2013.

=== United States ===
==== Training ====
Hospitalists are physicians with a Doctor of Medicine (M.D.), Doctor of Osteopathic Medicine (D.O.), or a Bachelor of Medicine/Bachelor of Surgery (MBBS/MBChB) degree. Most hospitalists practicing in hospitals in the United States lack board certification in hospital medicine. To address this, residency programs are starting to develop hospitalist tracks with more tailored education. Several universities have also started fellowship programs specifically geared toward hospital medicine.

According to the State of Hospital Medicine Survey by the Medical Group Management Association and the Society of Hospital Medicine, 89.60% of hospitalists specialize in general internal medicine, 5.5% in a pediatrics subspecialty, 3.7% in family practice and 1.2% in internal medicine pediatrics. Data from the survey also reported that 53.5% of hospitalists are employed by hospitals/integrated delivery system and 25.3% are employed by independent hospitalists groups.

According to recent data, there are more than 50,000 hospitalists practicing in approximately 75% of U.S. hospitals, including all highly ranked academic medical centers.

==== History ====
Hospital medicine is a relatively new phenomenon in American medicine and as such is the fastest growing specialty in the history of medicine. Almost unheard of a generation ago, this type of practice arose from three powerful shifts in medical practice:

- Nearly all states, as well as the national residency accreditation organizations, the Accreditation Council for Graduate Medical Education (ACGME) and the American Osteopathic Association (AOA), have established limitations on house staff duty hours, the number of hours that interns and residents can work. Many hospitalists are coming to perform the same tasks formerly performed by residents; although this is usually referred to as a House Officer rather than a hospitalist. The fundamental difference between a hospitalist and a house officer is that the hospitalist is the attending physician of a patient while that patient is hospitalized. The house officer admits the patient for another attending physician and cares for that patient until the attending physician can see the patient.
- Most primary care physicians are experiencing a shrinking role in hospital care. Many primary care physicians find they can generate more revenue in the office during the hour or more they would have spent on inpatient rounds, including traveling to and from the hospital.

In addition to patient care duties, hospitalists are often involved in developing and managing aspects of hospital operations such as inpatient flow and quality improvement. The formation of hospitalist training tracks in residency programs has been driven in part by the need to educate future hospitalists about business and operational aspects of medicine, as these topics are not covered in traditional residencies.

==== Certification ====
As a relatively new specialty, only recently has certification for specialty experience and training for hospital medicine been offered. The American Board of Hospital Medicine (ABHM), a Member Board of the American Board of Physician Specialties (ABPS), was founded in 2009. The ABHM was North America’s first board of certification devoted exclusively to hospital medicine. In September 2009, the American Board of Internal Medicine (ABIM) created a program that provides general internists practicing in hospital settings the opportunity to maintain Internal Medicine Certification with a Focused Practice in Hospital Medicine (FPHM).

==== Employment ====
The number of available hospitalists positions grew exponentially from 2006 to 2010 but has since then leveled off. However, the job market still remained very active with some hospitals maintaining permanent openings for capable hospitalists. Salaries are generally very competitive, averaging almost $230,000 per year for adult hospitalists. Hospitalists who are willing to work night shifts only (nocturnists) are generally compensated higher than their day shift peers.

==== Hospitalist groups as employers ====
Hospitalists typically work for a hospitalist group that is employed either directly through the hospital or through a physician services company, which earns a multimillion-dollar subsidy from the hospital to operate the group. This arrangement is a contrast to other physician specialties which typically recoup their costs directly though their billing for medical services.

As of 2023, there are around seven large national physician services companies which compete to provide the hospitalist group for health systems, along with many smaller companies. Most of these companies, however, traditionally focus on the emergency department, where billing is lucrative and margins are higher, and they accept the hospitalist group management partnership as a necessary and less profitable add-on.

From the perspective of a hospital CFO, hospitalists require large subsidies that other physicians may not need. The drive to minimize these subsidies incentivizes the reduction of shifts and increase of a hospitalist's average patient census, which can in turn decrease hospitalist job satisfaction and increase risks to patient safety. Whether these incentives are acted on depends on the financial situation of the hospital, the relationship between the hospitalist group and the hospital, and the working conditions acceptable to the employed hospitalists.

== Quality initiatives ==
Research shows that hospitalists reduce the length of stay, treatment costs and improve the overall efficiency of care for hospitalized patients. Hospitalists are leaders on several quality improvement initiatives in key areas including transitions of care, co-management of patients, reducing hospital acquired diseases and optimizing the care of patients.

== Related terminology ==
Though hospital medicine is a young field, there have been attempts at further division of labor in the field.

- A nocturnist is a hospitalist who typically covers the twelve-hour shift at night and admits patients as well as receives calls about already admitted patients.
- A proceduralist is generally defined as a hospitalist who primarily does procedures in the hospital such as central venous catheter insertions, lumbar punctures, and paracenteses.
- A neurohospitalist cares for hospitalized patients with or at risk for neurological problems.
- A surgicalist is a surgeon who specializes and focuses on surgical care in the hospital setting.

The following are other commonly used (negative) nicknames:

- An admitologist or admitter is a hospitalist who only admits patients.
- A dischargologist is a hospitalist who only discharges patients.
- A rounder is a hospitalist who only sees admitted patients.

== See also ==
- Society of Hospital Medicine
- Obstetric hospitalist
- Lists of hospitals
- Interdisciplinary bedside rounds
