= Acute medicine =

Internal medicine specialty

Acute medicine, also known as acute internal medicine (AIM), is a specialty within internal medicine concerned with the immediate and early specialist management of adult patients with a wide range of medical conditions who present in hospital as emergencies. It developed in the United Kingdom in the early 2000s as a dedicated field of medicine, together with the establishment of acute medical units in numerous hospitals. Acute medicine is distinct from the broader field of emergency medicine, which is concerned with the management of all people attending the emergency department, not just those with internal medicine diagnoses.

== History ==
The field developed in the United Kingdom after the Royal College of Physicians of Edinburgh and the Royal College of Physicians and Surgeons of Glasgow published a joint report in 1998 emphasising the importance of appropriate care for people with acute medical problems. Further reports led to the development of acute medicine as a dedicated specialty, and in 2003 it was recognised by the Specialist Training Authority as a subspecialty of General Internal Medicine.

Around the same time, it was recognised that care for acutely admitted patients should ideally be concentrated in "medical assessment units" (MAUs), later named "acute medical units" (AMUs). A physician experienced in the management of acute medical problems could assess and treat these patients in the most appropriate fashion for the first 48 hours of their admission, aiming either for an early discharge with appropriate outpatient follow-up or transfer to a specialist ward. Severely ill patients who need close observation but do not require intensive care may be treated in a dedicated area such as a physician-run high-dependency unit.

In 2007, some questioned whether the specialty would have a long-term future, if at some point UK government ED targets ceased to exist. However, Robert Wachter has stated that acute medical units "have been associated with lower inpatient mortality, improved patient and staff satisfaction, reduced hospital stays, and increased throughput."

A further development has been the increase of ambulatory care. Where patients were previously admitted to hospital, it may now be possible for them to attend a clinic or an assessment area a number of times while their progress is monitored. This is now a very common approach to suspected deep vein thrombosis, but the NHS Institute for Innovation and Improvement has identified a number of other conditions that can be managed in an ambulatory emergency care setting.

In 2009, the General Medical Council approved acute medicine as a distinct specialty, allowing doctors to specialise in it in order to receive their Certificate of Completion of Training.

== Organisations ==
The Society for Acute Medicine was founded in 2000. It is "the national representative body for staff caring for medical patients in the acute hospital setting. In the Netherlands, the Dutch Acute Medicine (DAM) society was formed in 2012 and held its first Congress on 28 September 2012 in the VU University Medical Center in Amsterdam. Its curriculum aimed to ensure 12 training posts throughout the Netherlands.

== See also ==
- Hospital medicine
