= John Abner Snell =

American missionary and surgeon in China (1880–1936)

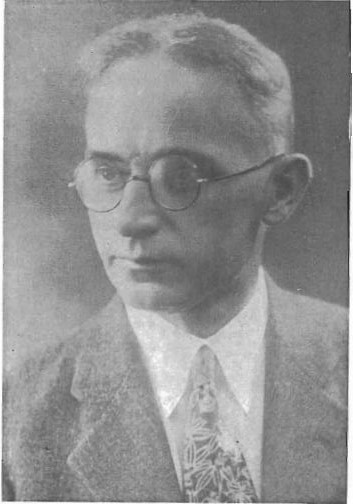
- Born: October 28, 1880; Knife Falls, Carlton County, Minnesota, United States
- Died: March 2, 1936 (aged 55); Suzhou, Republic of China
- Other name: Soo E. Sang
- Education: Vanderbilt University
- Occupations: Surgeon, doctor, medical missionary
- Employer: Methodist Episcopal Church
- Known for: Superintendent of Soochow Hospital, surgical work, medical research
- Spouse: Grace Birkett Snell (m. 1907–1936)
- Children: 7

John Abner Snell (28 October 1880 – 2 March 1936), also known as Soo E. Sang, was an American missionary, surgeon, and hospital administrator in Suzhou (Soochow), China. Snell was a devout Christian, and as early as age 14 he stated: "I aim to devote myself to God's service." After graduating from Vanderbilt Medical College in 1908, Dr. Snell applied for a post at the Methodist Missionary Society. He was appointed to the Methodist Episcopal Church (South) Hospital in Soochow.

Snell was known for his skillful surgical work, collection of data regarding syphilis prevalence, research into the host of blood flukes, and public health campaigns against tuberculosis. Under his administration, the Soochow Hospital underwent a large expansion, acquired modern technology, and was held to a very high standard. He was considered one of "the finest and most skillful surgeons ever coming to China." Snell encouraged the integration of local workers in the mission hospital, stating in one report: "Let us take into partnership with us the people among whom and for whom we are working and co-operate with them to establish medical standards." The hospital where Snell once worked, now The First Affiliated Hospital of Soochow University, is still considered one of the best in the region.

== Background ==
=== Education ===
John Snell was born to Amy Jarett and Leonidas Snell in Knife Falls, Carlton County, Minnesota, as the 5th out of 8 children. When he was six years old, his family moved to

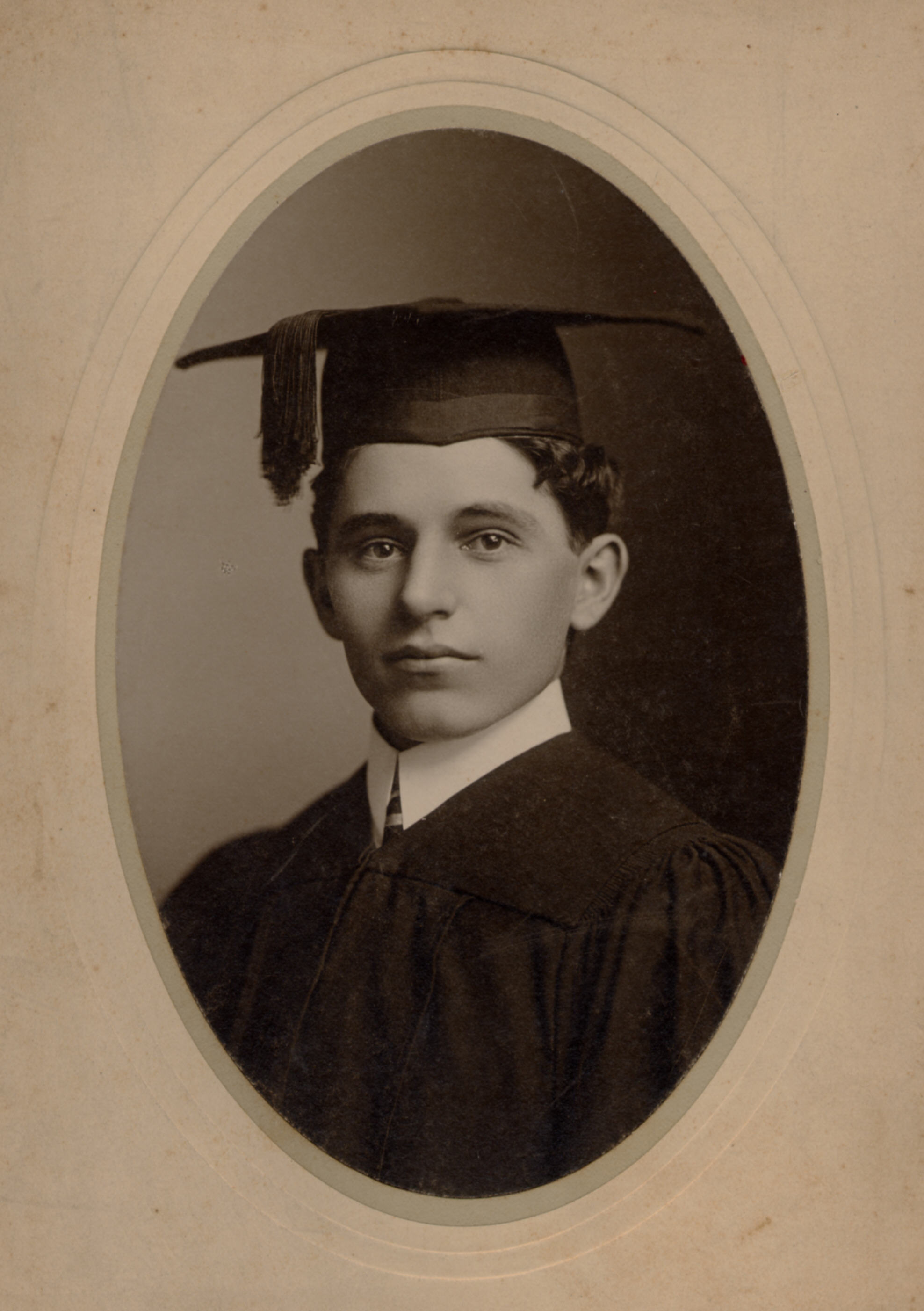
John Abner Snell upon graduation from Vanderbilt

Kissimmee, Florida. In 1896, they moved again to Nashville, Tennessee, without his father, because his mother insisted that the children have the best possible college opportunities. Snell's father never joined the rest of the family in Tennessee. Amy only rejoined him in Florida in 1916, once their children had finished their educations. In 1899, Snell enrolled and began attending Emory College. However, in 1890 he transferred to Peabody Normal School, which later became Vanderbilt University. On May 27, 1903, Snell graduated with a Bachelor of Arts degree. He worked as a teacher in Goleta, California from 1903–1904, and in Calistoga from 1904–1905 in order to make enough money to support his younger siblings at home. Upon his return to Tennessee, Snell applied to Vanderbilt Medical University. Snell studied medicine until 1908, when he obtained his M.D., followed by a short internship as a doctor. Before graduation, Snell applied to the Methodist Episcopal Church for a posting abroad as a missionary worker. Nominated by William Hector Park and M.H. Polk, he was appointed the job.

=== Role of religion ===
Religion played a significant role throughout Snell's childhood. He had a Methodist upbringing, and attended Sunday school every week. When he applied for the posting as a missionary, he wrote that at age 11 he had accepted Christ as his personal savior, and that at age 14 he had a desire to devote himself to God's service. Additionally, in his final years as a student at Peabody College, John was an active member of the Student Volunteer Movement for Foreign Missions, an organization based in New York. They aimed to "enroll a sufficient number of properly qualified students who purpose to devote their lives to foreign missionary work." Coincidentally, Dr. Walter Lambuth, the Missionary Secretary of the Methodist Episcopal Church, who started the hospital where Snell would go on to work in Soochow, China, was on the advisory committee of the Student Volunteer Movement at the time. Lambuth held popular bible study groups in his home, one of the ways which Snell familiarized himself with Soochow and the missionary work of the Methodist Episcopal Church.

== Methodist missionary work: Soochow ==
=== Early years ===
In January, 1909, John Snell and Grace Birkett Snell arrived in Soochow, China. The Soochow Hospital, which was also a medical school, was established in 1883 by Dr. Walter Russell Lambuth and Dr. William Hector Park. One of

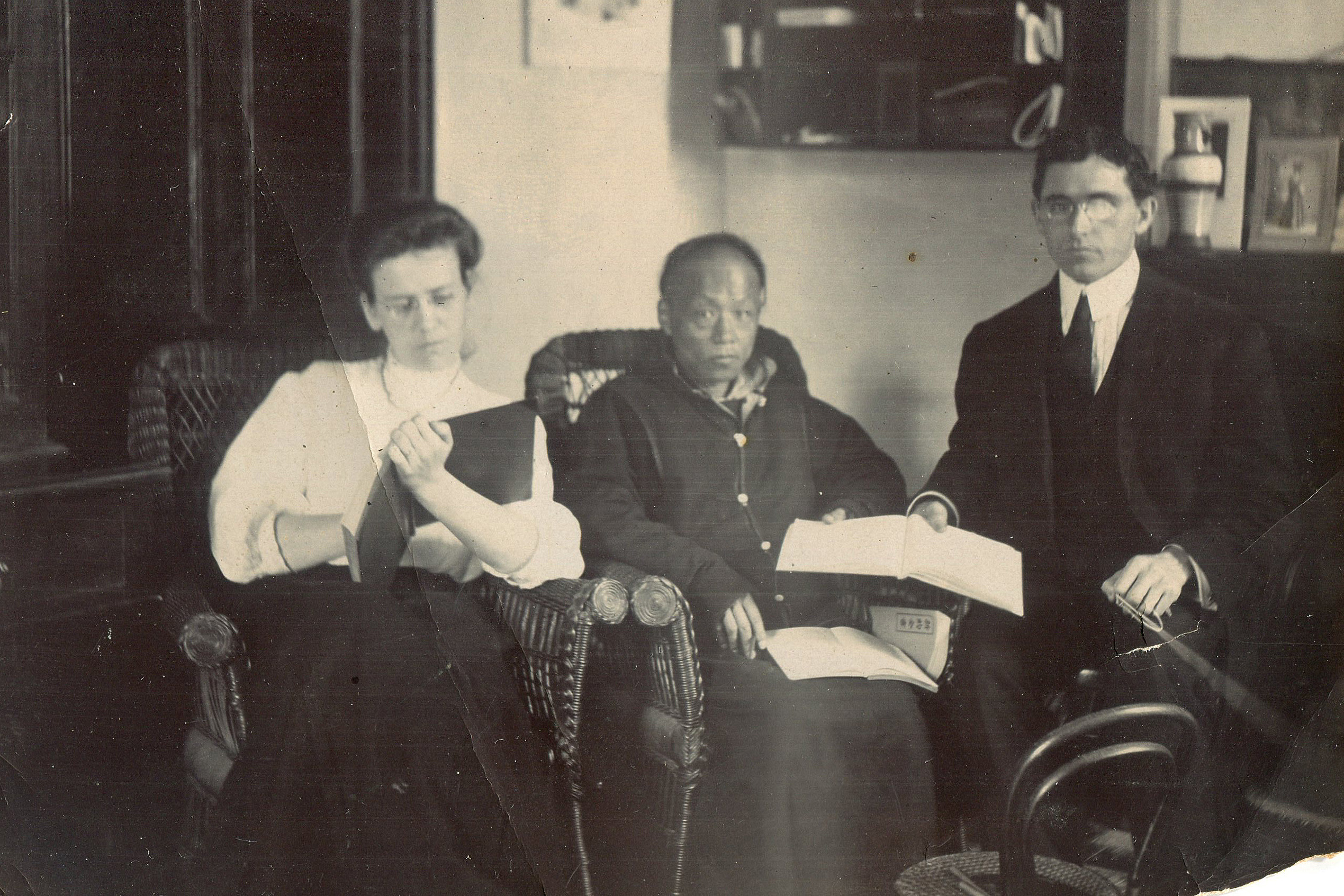
John and Grace Snell learning Chinese

the first medical colleges in China, it consisted of free standing buildings with enclosed walkways. The school, which taught males and females, was unique in that teachers always instructed in both English and Chinese, with drug names and diseases taught in Latin. No textbooks were available, so lectures were written on blackboards and explained to students as necessary in English or Chinese. This method had great success in reducing dependency on foreign products and doctors in the hospital. The medical school had a variety of notable graduates, including Yang Vee Yuer, who became the superintendent of the Soochow Hospital and a professor at Soochow University.

When Snell first arrived, Park, the head doctor at the hospital at the time, had just left on furlough for a year. Snell was left in charge of the hospital. Upon Park's return, the responsibilities were split, leaving Snell responsible for surgery and administration. Main concerns over this period included appendicitis, alcoholism, pneumonia, measles, typhoid, diphtheria, diarrheal diseases and scarlet fever, which were reported as "endemic" in Soochow in a hospital medical report. Snell was recorded as earning Mex. $12,236 in the year 1910, comparatively more than many of the missionaries working for the Methodist Episcopal Church at the time. In 1914 Snell's wages increased by $600 per year as he also took on the job of Business Manager of the Chinese Medical Journal. By 1915, the hospital was only dependent on Americans for the wages for American workers, and otherwise was self-sufficient.

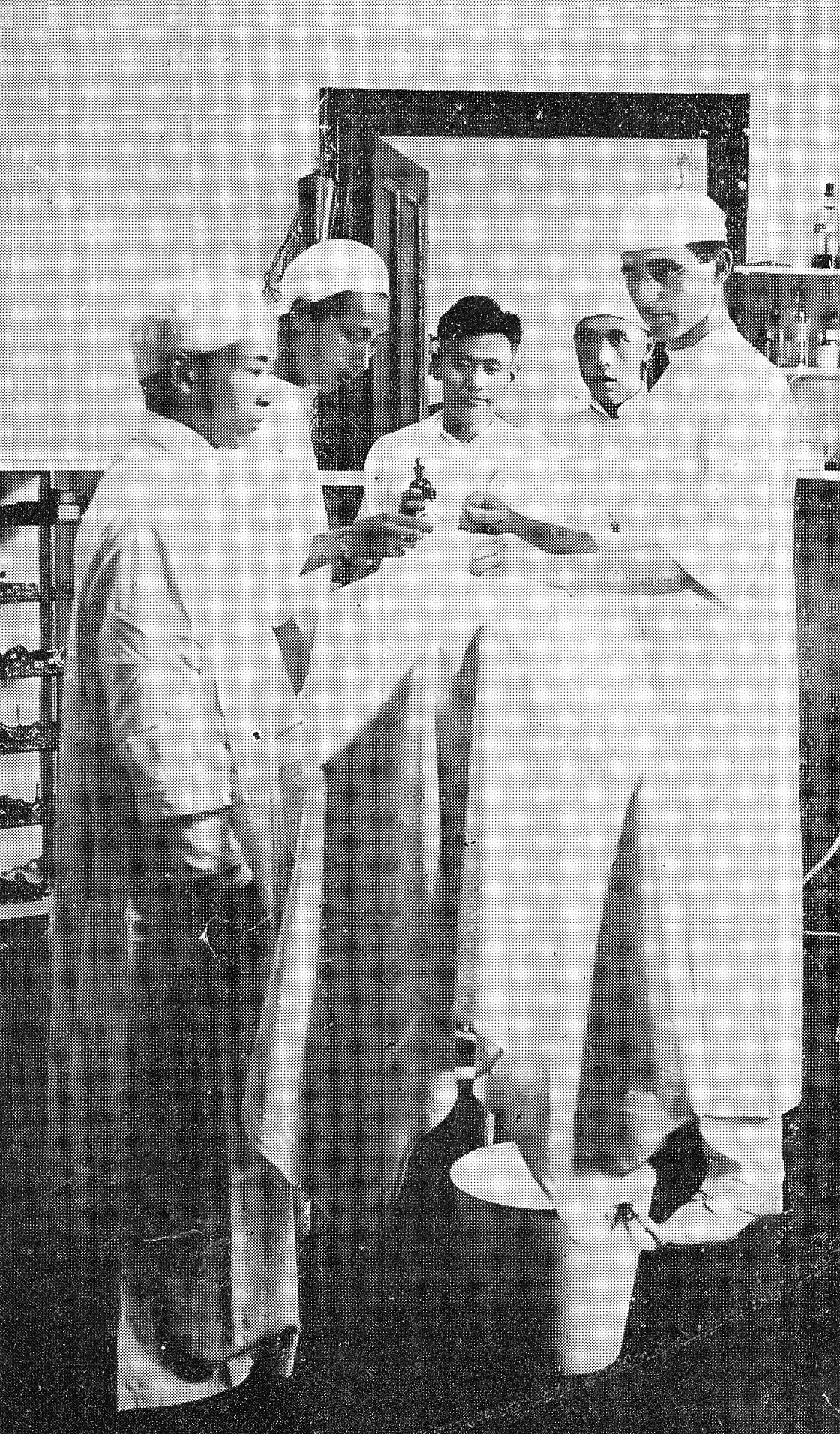
Dr. Snell in Surgery

In 1916, the hospital recorded treatment for 15,432 in- and out-patients. Approximately 3000 of these patients were treated surgically, and the annual report noted that "in surgery the work has been heavier and more varied than in any preceding year." Snell was one of three surgeons at the hospital according to the report, and therefore was constantly working. This was due to nearby political unrest and conflict of Wukiang in 1916, which resulted in the Red Cross asking the hospital to take on some of their patients. One of Snell's projects included informing the public about the danger of transmission of disease through insects, including flies, mosquitoes, and fruit flies. In 1917, the hospital was responsible for a campaign with the local police department to remove stagnant water and cover fruit at stands, however little success was recorded.

=== Construction and operation of a new hospital ===
Snell's biggest project and main goal in Soochow was the construction of a new hospital. In 1917, Snell was the head of the hospital and began fundraising for a bigger and better equipped hospital. He visited areas of Korea and China for construction and design ideas with G. F. Ashley, who was hired as the architect. The new hospital costs were estimated to be around $200,000, funds raised by Snell. $80,000 were provided by the Board of Missions of the Methodist Episcopal Church, and $70,000 were raised in China. However, in 1919, a large grant of $50,000 from the Rockefeller Foundation permitted construction to begin. Years later, the Rockefeller Foundation continued to fund the Soochow hospital for maintenance, research, construction and other fees, as indicated by annual reports.

The hospital consisted of a two-story outpatient clinic and a three-story main hospital. The design was primarily Western, although the outpatient wing was still built in a Chinese style, connected to the main hospital through a covered gallery. It was fireproof, and included a rooftop garden, new machines, an X-ray suite, a sterilizing room, a pharmacy, religious offices, electricity, and air conditioning in 2 new well-lit operating rooms, along with other modern features. Four new hospital staff residences were constructed, and nurse's quarters were added in order to improve the nursing school for native women. Additionally, administration obtained a new X-ray machine which greatly improved the hospital's ability for diagnosis.

On November 6, 1922, the hospital was officially opened, with 165 beds and new staff. It was considered one of the best hospitals in "China, in England, in America, or in Europe" according to The North-China Herald, due to its state of the art facilities, which Snell helped to initiate. In fact, in 1926, Soochow hospital was one of only four hospitals in China to meet the standards of the American Board of Surgeons, an indicator of its high quality facilities and qualified doctors such as Snell. According to the China Medical Journal, at the new hospital Snell taught a popular laboratory course for technicians in order to improve diagnosis through the use of equipment.

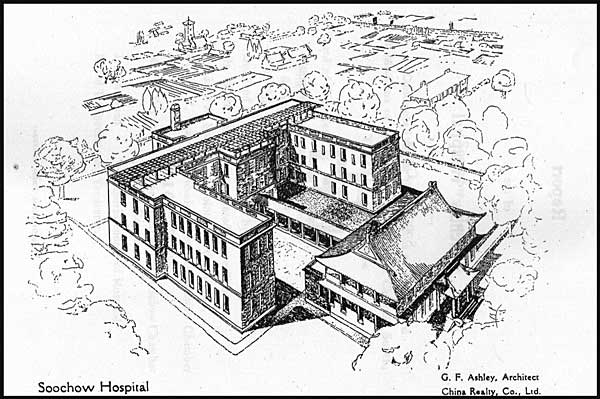

==== Female Nurses Report ====
One of Snell's initiatives in Soochow was to employ more female nurses in both the male and female wards of the hospital, rare at the time. He reported that the female nurses he worked with in China were kinder and there were fewer cases of rudeness and disrespect from male patients. Within three years of implementing this program, his employment of local female nurses was recommended to be used as a model in missions across China.

==== City Hospitals Report ====
Dr. Snell was a strong advocate for building modern hospitals in urban areas. He also supported the inclusion of Chinese staff on boards and in head positions of hospitals, which made him a primary contributor to the sustainability and reduced American dependence of the Soochow Hospital. In his paper, the "City Hospital", Snell encouraged all major metropolitan areas to build a minimum of one new hospital at the cost of $300,000, with Chinese members on the board and management committees of the hospitals. The report discloses Snell's beliefs on missionary work and how hospitals should be built and managed during the time period. Snell claimed that the aim of a medical mission "should be to primarily prevent and heal disease in the name of the Great Physician," rather than "spread the Gospel of Jesus Christ," as he says mission work does. Snell believed that medical work was much more beneficial to individuals than "submerging the healing by preaching," and continuously pushed for the need for up-to-date medical practice and equipment, one of the reasons that the new aforementioned hospital was such a success.

Snell also established the concept of treating minor medical issues in a cheaper building, while those who were seriously ill could have access to a bed and more extensive care. Another idea which affected the majority of hospitals in the region included the value of sunshine as a disinfectant, and as such he insisted all rooms receive sun. He also set up department heads with his staff, so that each doctor became a specialist in order to have more efficient treatment. These were (1) Medicine, (2), Surgery, (3) Eye, Ear, Nose and Throat, (4) Gynecology and Obstetrics and (5) Pathology. Finally, Snell recommended that small individual missions in the same region should combine to have a resources available in one larger and inclusive facility.

=== Research and medical work ===
==== Feces examination, hookworm, and snail fluke ====
On October 1, 1911, Snell made feces examination a routine part of diagnosis throughout the hospital, for every patient. This step was undertaken in order to ensure that patients with internal parasites could be treated even if it they were the primary reason for which the patient came to the hospital. Snell reported that he most often found Ankylostoma, Oxyuris, and Schistosoma japonicum. He noted that there was an infection rate of 76.4% which would go unaccounted for, and were instead usually recorded as dysentery. This later served as the motive for his extensive research into the Schistosoma japonicum hookworm infections, which he started in 1923. July 1, Soochow Hospital established a field laboratory in order to investigate the hookworm epidemic and spread of the disease. Research included analyzing the lifespan of the parasite and evaluating what could be put in fertilizers to prevent its growth on crops. The report was compiled along with Henry Edmund Meleney and Ernest Carroll, and helped to identify the mollusk as the same species as one located near Shanghai.

===== Appendicitis =====
Snell wrote a comprehensive report on the 206 treated appendicitis cases admitted to the Soochow hospital from 1914–1927, not including outpatients. Snell estimated that there was someone admitted to the hospital with appendicitis every 25 days, and that 1.1% of all patients at the hospital were diagnosed with it. However, Snell faced difficulty when he first arrived in China. Appendectomy surgeries were not widely socially acceptable at the time of his arrival, so some patients refused the surgery. In a report Snell states that out of 128 patients who required operations in one year, 34 Chinese patients refused. For example, one of Snell's patients, a teacher from a wealthy Soochow family, refused surgery in spring and his condition only degraded until September, when he was finally operated on.

===== Gastric ulcers =====
Snell insisted that gastric ulcers were far more common among Chinese patients than previously believed, and that many cases of digestive troubles were incorrectly treated. He believed that one reason for this may have been the difficulty of obtaining accurate information from patients due to language barrier and inconsistencies in patient explanations. He encouraged more thorough evaluations of patient history as an element of diagnosis, and published an extensive report, the "Diagnosis of Chronic Duodenal and Gastric Ulcers," on how to recognize ulcers adeptly. As Snell was the doctor in charge of the X-ray and associated equipment, he devised a technique to detect ulcers via X-ray analysis through the consumption of barium-containing rice soup. The soup was a method of quick success in the hospital, as patients were more comfortable eating a dish which complied with social context as a part of medical treatment.

==== Cholera ====
In 1919, a cholera epidemic swept across Eastern China and revived local doctors' interest in the disease. Snell stated that the Soochow Hospital treated around five new cases per day in the summer of 1919. They implemented a variety of treatment techniques, primarily intravenous Rogers treatment of saline solution. Snell also treated cholera patients with emetine hypodermically, and later published one of the first papers on how it could act as a poison in large doses. Of the patients at Soochow, there was 27.4% mortality.

Snell was also actively involved with treating syphilis, malaria and tuberculosis. Snell's investigation into syphilis was the first comprehensive report of its kind in China.

== Family ==
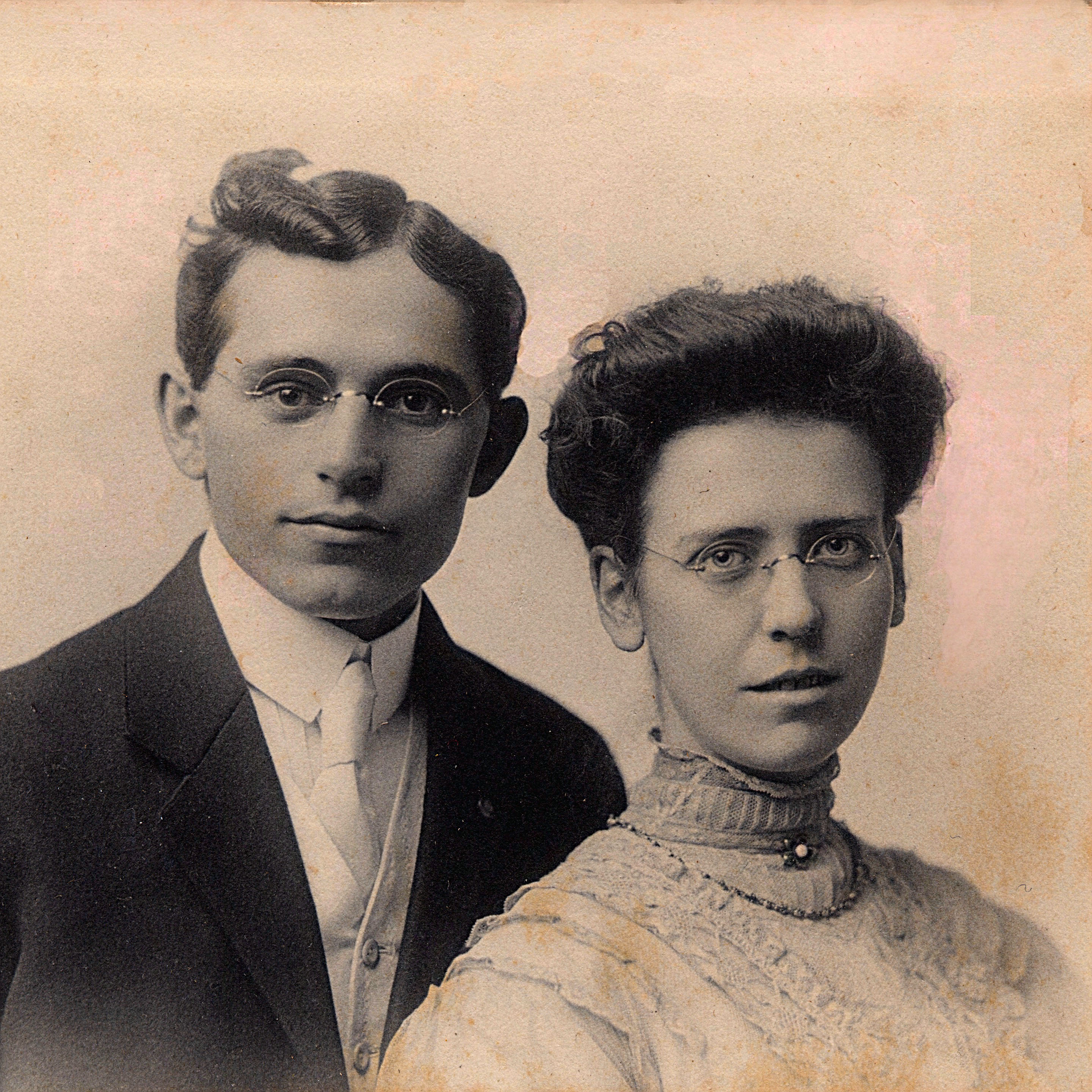
John Abner Snell and Grace Birkett

John Abner Snell met his wife, Grace Evelyn Birkett Snell, his junior year of college. They were engaged in 1902 and married on November 1, 1907 in Nashville, Tennessee by Revered James Clarke. They had seven children. Every seven years, they returned from China to the US on furlough for one year. In 1932, many of his children remained in the US after his furlough ended in order to have a better education.

== Other means of income ==
Snell broke many mission rules about engaging in outside enterprises, arguing that they were recreation which did not minimize his time at work. His most notable hobby was his coin collection. Snell published his own article, "Chinese Copper Coins of the Twentieth Century," in the June 1932 issue of The Numismatist. He owned approximately 950 brass, silver, and copper coins, some of them with rare patterns. They were left in a family trunk to Snell's son, John Raymond Snell and eventually auctioned to the public on December 2, 2011. His coin collection has been referenced in several coin collectors' journals and articles, such as A.M Tracey Woodward's 1931 article.

In addition to his work as a missionary doctor, Dr. Snell was also started a local brick factory as well as a dairy farm, from which he sold dairy products to the local area.

== Death ==
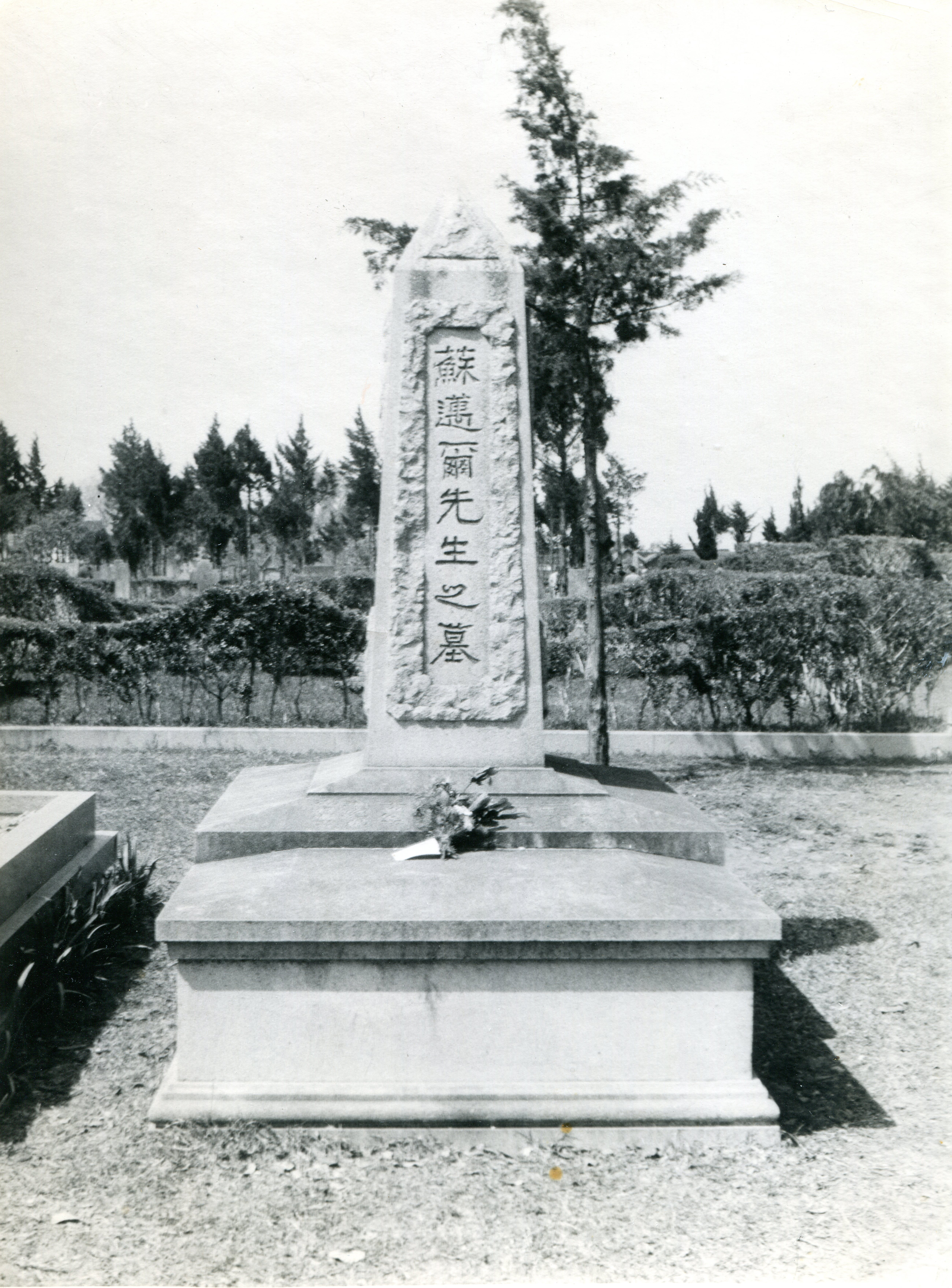
Grave of John Abner Snell

On February 24, 1936, Snell contracted pneumonia and had a temperature recorded of 102 degrees Fahrenheit. He was admitted to the hospital and doctors were called from Huchow and Chanchow, but there was nothing that could be done. While on his deathbed, Snell is reported to have said "There can be nothing happier than a life whose first purpose is to demonstrate Christian love through service." On March 2, 1936, Snell died of pneumonia, aged 55. He was buried in Soochow; the cemetery was razed during the Cultural Revolution.
