= Sherry Chou =

Canadian neurologist

Sherry Hsiang-Yi Chou
- Education: McGill University; Beth Israel Deaconess Medical Center; Massachusetts General Hospital; Brigham and Women's Hospital
- Known for: Neurology; Critical care Stroke
- Scientific career
- Workplaces: University of Pittsburgh; Harvard Medical School

Sherry Hsiang-Yi Chou is a Canadian neurologist and an Associate Professor of Neurology and Chief of Neurocritical Care at the Northwestern University Feinberg School of Medicine and Northwestern Medicine. She is a Fellow of the Neurocritical Care Society and the Society of Critical Care Medicine. During the COVID-19 pandemic Chou assembled a worldwide team of physicians and scientists to better understand the neurological impacts of COVID-19, forming the Global Consortium Study of Neurologic Dysfunction in COVID-19 (GCS-NeuroCOVID). The first report of this large, multicenter, multicontinent consortium found that neurological manifestations are present in 8 out of 10 adult patients hospitalized with COVID-19 and are associated with increased mortality.

== Early life and education ==
Chou studied mathematics and physics at McGill University. She remained there for her medical degree, which she completed in 2001. Chou completed medical internship at Beth Israel Deaconess Medical Center and residency in Neurology followed by fellowship in stroke and neurocritical care at Massachusetts General Hospital and Brigham and Women's Hospital. Chou completed a master's degree in clinical translational research at Harvard Medical School in 2009. Following completion of training Chou remained on faculty at Brigham and Women's Hospital, where Chou worked on numerous large clinical trials such as the Antihypertensive Treatment of Acute Cerebral Hemorrhage-II (ATACH-II) research protocol, which looked to identify the therapeutic benefit of intensive blood pressure treatment in intracerebral haemorrhage patients. She worked at Brigham for several years, holding a simultaneous faculty position at the Harvard Medical School.

== Research and career ==
Chou was appointed to the University of Pittsburgh in 2014. Her research and practise looks to improve the treatment of critically ill patients who suffer from haemorrhagic brain injury. Chou has a particular focus on subarachnoid haemorrhage (SAH) and the identification of novel biomarkers. She studies how the inflammation that occurs after SAH can result in secondary brain injury, and how this impacts recovery. To do this, Chou monitors microRNA biomarkers of systemic inflammation. She created a biobank of samples collected over the course of patients' time in hospital. This data allowed Chou to identify a specific inflammation biomarker that is only detectable in the early days of brain injury.

During the COVID-19 pandemic it emerged that in certain cases, the viral infection resulting from severe acute respiratory syndrome coronavirus 2 (SARS-CoV-2) can cause a rare type of encephalopathy. These observations were first observed in Wuhan, and subsequently across Europe and the United States. The overreaction of the immune system in response to SARS-CoV-2 infection triggers a cytokine storm, whereby immune cells and cytokines are excessively produced. Cytokine overproduction can cause small haemorrhages in the brain. Whilst the neurological symptoms related to COVID-19 are rare, Chou argued that physicians needed to crowdsource their observations to provide better care. COVID-19 may its way upward to the brain through the nose and olfactory bulb, which may explain the anosmia. The Centers for Disease Control and Prevention (CDC) added "new confusion or inability to arouse" to their COVID-19 emergency warning signs, which means that people who show these symptoms must seek medical attention immediately. Through her work with the Neurocritical Care Society, Chou has since established a world-wide consortium of researchers to track the prevalence of neurological complications in hospitalised COVID-19 patients.

=== Awards and honours ===
- 2014 Elected Fellow of the Neurocritical Care Society
- 2016 McGill University Medicine Alumni Global Awards
- 2017 Elected Fellow of the Society of Critical Care Medicine

== Selected publications ==
- Chou, Sherry H.-Y.; Feske, Steven K.; Atherton, Juli; Konigsberg, Rachael G.; De Jager, Philip L.; Du, Rose; Ogilvy, Christopher S.; Lo, Eng H.; Ning, MingMing (2012-10-01). "Early Elevation of Serum Tumor Necrosis Factor-α Is Associated With Poor Outcome in Subarachnoid Hemorrhage". Journal of Investigative Medicine. 60 (7): 1054–1058. doi:10.2310/jim.0b013e3182686932. ISSN 1081-5589. PMC 3740211. PMID 22918199.
- Chou, Sherry H.-Y.; Lan, Jing; Esposito, Elga; Ning, MingMing; Balaj, Leonora; Ji, Xunming; Lo, Eng H.; Hayakawa, Kazuhide (2017). "Extracellular Mitochondria in Cerebrospinal Fluid and Neurological Recovery After Subarachnoid Hemorrhage". Stroke. 48 (8): 2231–2237. doi:10.1161/strokeaha.117.017758. ISSN 0039-2499. PMC 5526718. PMID 28663512.
- Berkowitz, A.L.; Westover, B.; Bianchi, M.T.; Chou, S.H. (2015-03-12). "Aspirin for secondary prevention after stroke of unknown etiology in resource-limited settings: a decision analysis". Annals of Global Health. 81 (1): 87. doi:10.1016/j.aogh.2015.02.702. ISSN 2214-9996.
- Berkowitz, A. L.; Westover, M. B.; Bianchi, M. T.; Chou, S. H.-Y. (2014-07-23). "Aspirin for acute stroke of unknown etiology in resource-limited settings: A decision analysis". Neurology. 83 (9): 787–793. doi:10.1212/wnl.0000000000000730. ISSN 0028-3878. PMC 4155044. PMID 25056582.

Chou serves on editorial board of the journal Neurocritical Care on Call.
