= Renal biopsy =

Removal of kidney tissue for medical examination

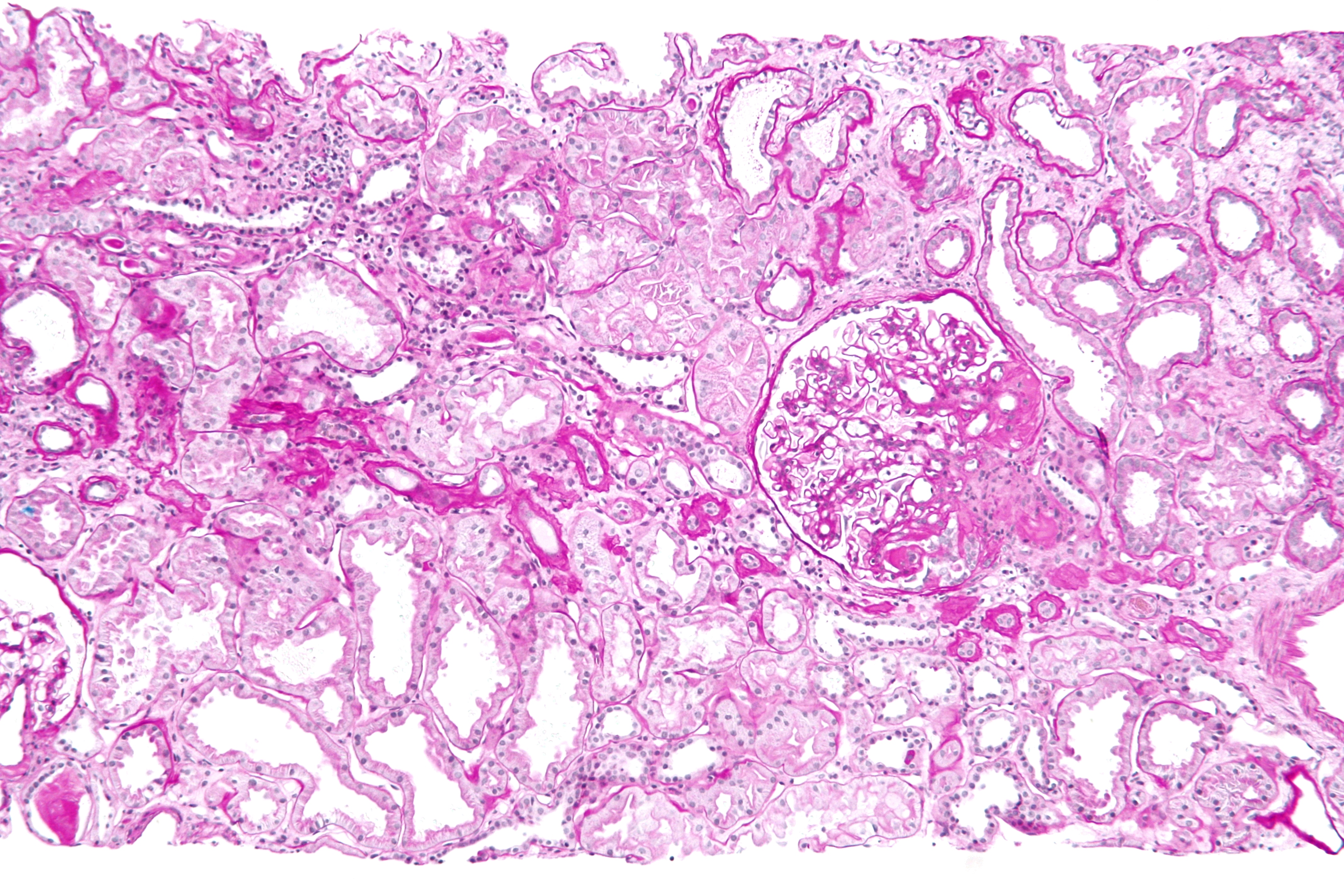
- Micrograph showing a renal core biopsy. PAS stain.
- ICD-9-CM: 55.23-55.24
- MedlinePlus: 003907

Renal biopsy (also kidney biopsy) is a medical procedure in which a small piece of kidney is removed from the body for examination, usually under a microscope. Microscopic examination of the tissue can provide information needed to diagnose, monitor or treat problems of the kidney.

A renal biopsy can be targeted to a particular lesion, for example a tumour arising from the kidney (targeted renal biopsy). More commonly, however, the biopsy is non-targeted as medical conditions affecting the kidney typically involve all kidney tissue indiscriminately. In the latter situation, any sufficiently sized piece of kidney tissue can be used.

A native renal biopsy is one in which the patient's own kidneys are biopsied. In a transplant renal biopsy, the kidney of another person that has been transplanted into the patient is biopsied. Transplant kidney biopsy can be performed when nothing is apparently wrong with the transplant kidney for the purposes of surveillance for hidden disease (protocol transplant biopsy). This is typically done at 0, 3 and 12 months post-transplant according to a transplant unit protocol. Biopsy of the transplanted kidney taken during the transplant operation is termed implantation transplant biopsy or post-perfusion transplant biopsy depending on the timing of the biopsy with respect to key stages of the operation. When the transplanted kidney is not working properly, biopsy may be undertaken to identify the cause of dysfunction. This is referred to as an indication transplant biopsy, because something has prompted the performance of the biopsy.

Renal biopsy may be performed with the aid of "real-time" medical imaging to guide the positioning of biopsy equipment (imaging-guided renal biopsy). Alternatively, a biopsy may be performed without imaging-guidance using indirect assessments of position such as "needle-swing" to confirm appropriate placement of biopsy equipment (blind renal biopsy).

== History ==
Before 1951, the only way of obtaining kidney tissue from a live person was through an open operation.

In 1951, Danish physicians Poul Iversen and Claus Brun described a method involving needle biopsy which has become the new standard.

Recent widespread availability of real-time imaging guidance using ultrasound or CT scanning having improved perceived safety of the procedure.

== Indications ==
Kidney biopsy is performed on selected patients with kidney disease. It is most commonly used when less invasive tests are insufficient. The decision on whether or not to proceed to a kidney biopsy is usually made by a nephrologist.

The following are examples of the most common reasons for native kidney biopsy:

- Haematuria (or blood in the urine) can occur with a number of conditions that affect the kidneys and urinary tract. While renal biopsy is not indicated in all cases of haematuria, it may be performed in those with glomerular haematuria (blood that is thought to come from damage to the glomerulus) or when combined with features of progressive renal disease (e.g. increasing proteinuria, elevated blood pressure and kidney failure). One example is the nephritic syndrome.
- Proteinuria (or protein in the urine) occurs in many renal conditions. Renal biopsy is usually reserved for patients with high or increasing levels of proteinuria, or for patients who have proteinuria along with other signs of renal dysfunction. One example is the nephrotic syndrome.
- Kidney failure (or impaired kidney function due to kidney injury) can occur abruptly (acute kidney failure) or progress over a period of time (chronic kidney disease). The cause of acute kidney failure can usually be determined without kidney biopsy. Biopsy is performed in those instances where the cause is uncertain.
- Targeted kidney biopsy can be used to obtain tissue from a tumour arising from or adjacent the kidney.

Transplant kidney biopsy is performed in the following circumstances:

- For surveillance of hidden disease involving the transplant kidney, so-called protocol renal biopsy undertaken at fixed intervals post-transplantation.
- When the transplant kidney is not working as well as expected, or when there is a deterioration in function. In these instances, biopsy is performed to exclude rejection, BK nephropathy, drug-toxicity or recurrence of the disease that caused kidney failure in the first place.

== Contraindications ==
The safety of renal biopsy is affected by the following conditions:

=== Absolute ===
- bleeding diathesis
- uncontrolled severe high blood pressure
- uncooperative patient
- presence of a solitary native kidney

=== Relative ===
- azotemia or uraemia
- certain anatomical abnormalities of the kidney
- skin infection at the biopsy site
- medications that interfere with clotting (e.g. warfarin or heparin)
- pregnancy
- urinary tract infection
- obesity

== Procedure ==
=== Before biopsy ===
Like most invasive medical procedures, a renal biopsy is not without risk (see Complications). A nephrologist will have to satisfy themselves that a renal biopsy is of appropriate benefit to justify the risks of the procedure before proceeding. This will include careful consideration of patient characteristics and other clinical information obtained from history, examination and other less-invasive investigations.

Blood testing may be done before the biopsy to ensure that there is no evidence of infection or a blood clotting abnormality. Further, an ultrasound or other imaging study of the kidney may be performed before biopsy to exclude structural problems of the kidney, which may theoretically increase the risk of the procedure. These include hydronephrosis, pre-existing arteriovenous fistula in the kidney, cystic kidney disease and small, shrunken kidneys.

To decrease the risk of bleeding, patients are usually advised to avoid medicines that impair clotting for one to two weeks before the biopsy. These medications include aspirin, clopidogrel, heparin and warfarin. Desmopressin may be administered intravenously in the hope of reversing the clotting disturbance that accompanies kidney failure (uraemic coagulopathy). Strict control of blood pressure is also sought to reduce bleeding risk.

Prior to the procedure, informed consent is usually taken. Arrangements will also be made to ensure that appropriate post-biopsy care and supervision is in place. Fasting is usually not required. However, this will depend on centre preference.

=== During biopsy ===
Renal biopsy is typically performed by a nephrologist or interventional radiologist. The biopsy is planned with the assistance of ultrasound or CT scanning to visualise the location and depth of the kidneys immediately before the biopsy.

In the case of a native kidney biopsy, the procedure will be performed with the patient lying on their stomach (prone) or on their side (lateral decubitus position). For transplant renal biopsy, the patient lies on their back (supine). The biopsy procedure usually takes about 15 minutes.

The site of biopsy is prepared antiseptic solution and sterile drapes are applied. If real-time imaging is used, sterile coverings will be placed on the equipment. The person performing the procedure (proceduralist) will wash their hands and don a sterile gown and gloves. A mask may or may not be worn.

The biopsy is usually performed while the patient is awake or with mild sedation. Use of a general anaesthetic is typically not required.

After the site is prepared, the proceduralist injects local anaesthetic into the skin, through the subcutaneous tissue and down to and around the kidney. There may be a sharp sting as the local anaesthetic is injected. After a few seconds, the site will be numb and only a sensation of pressure should be felt. A small 1–2 mm incision is made to allow insertion of the biopsy needle. In most cases, real-time imaging will be used to guide positioning of the local anaesthetic and biopsy needles. In the case of blind biopsy, this will not be used. A loud click may be heard as the spring-loaded biopsy needle is fired into the kidney to obtain a tissue sample. The resulting core of kidney tissue is usually less than 1 mm in diameter and up to 1 cm long. This may be done more than once to obtain sufficient kidney tissue.

A pathologist or pathology scientist may be present at the biopsy to examine the core(s) of kidney tissue for adequacy under a low power microscope. They will inform the person performing the procedure about how much kidney tissue was obtained, specifically how of biopsy sample is kidney cortex and how much is kidney medulla. In some centres, this role will be performed by the proceduralist with the naked eye.

When enough kidney tissue has been obtained, pressure will be applied to the biopsy site. After a period of time, it will be cleaned and dressed. Sutures are usually not required.

=== After biopsy ===
Post-biopsy care will differ from centre to centre. Most hospitals will observe patients who have had renal biopsy for 4–6 hours to minimise the risk of bleeding. Blood pressure and urine are frequently monitored to ensure the patient does not have any bleeding complications. Mild-moderate pain is managed with simple analgesics such as paracetamol or acetaminophen. Severe pain is usually an indication of bleeding complication, and may prompt a longer hospital stay and further tests.

If there are no observed complications during this period, most hospitals will discharge patients and allow them to return home. Other centres will admit patients who have had renal biopsy overnight for observation.

Most hospitals will discharge patients post-renal biopsy with written instructions on what to do if complications occur.

== Complications ==
Serious complications of renal biopsy are uncommon. The risk of complications will vary from centre to centre based on experience and other technical factors.

The most common complication of kidney biopsy is bleeding. This reflects the density of blood vessels within the kidney and observation that individuals with kidney failure take longer to stop bleeding after trauma (uraemic coagulopathy). Bleeding complications include a collection of blood adjacent to or around the kidney (perinephric haematoma), bleeding into the urine with passage of blood stained urine (macroscopic haematuria) or bleeding from larger blood vessels that lie adjacent the kidney. If blood clots in the bladder, this can obstruct the bladder and lead to urinary retention. The majority of bleeding that occurs following renal biopsy usually resolves on its own without long-term damage. Less commonly, the bleeding may be brisk (causing shock) or persistent (causing anaemia) or both. In these circumstances, treatment with blood transfusion or surgery may be required. Surgical options to control bleeding include less invasive catheter-delivered particles to block bleeding vessels (angioembolisation) or open surgery. In most cases, bleeding can be controlled and the kidneys are not lost. Rarely, a heavily damaged kidney may need to be removed.

Infection is rare with modern sterile operating procedures. Damage to surrounding structures, such as bowel and bladder (more likely with transplant kidney biopsy), can occur.

Occasionally, a biopsy will have to be abandoned prematurely due to technical issues such as inaccessible or small kidneys, obscured kidneys, difficult to penetrate kidneys or observation of bleeding complication. Further, after the biopsy has been completed, microscopic examination of the tissue may reveal heavily scarred tissue prompting recommendation for re-biopsy to avoid sampling error.

As with all treatments, there is a risk of allergy to the disinfectant solution, sedation, local anaesthetic and materials (latex gloves, drapes, dressings) used for the procedure.

Finally, the biopsy needle may join an artery and vein in the kidney, resulting in the formation of an arteriovenous fistula. These usually do not cause problems and close on their own. They may be monitored over time with repeat Doppler ultrasonography. Rarely, they may result in intermittent bleeding into the urine or may grow in size and threaten to burst. In these instances, the fistula may be closed surgically or with angioembolisation.
