= Nocturnist =

Medical practitioner

A nocturnist is a hospitalist who only works overnight. Most nocturnists are trained in internal medicine or family medicine. However, there are nocturnists trained in other specialties, such as pediatrics. The main role of a nocturnist is to admit patients into the hospital from an emergency department, and to care for previously admitted inpatients through the night. Nocturnists differ from on-call doctors in that they work exclusively at night, rather than being on-call and also working daytime shifts. As of 2020, about half of teaching hospitals in the United States staff nocturnists, and a 2018 study reporting 76.1% of adults-only hospitals, 27.6% of children-only hospitals, and 68.2% of combined hospitals had nocturnists.

== Effectiveness ==
A 2015 study helped to characterize the impact of nocturnists. Compared with before implementation, there was no difference in mortality, 30-day readmissions, mean length of stay, or upgrades to intensive care with the addition of these overnight hospitalists. Similar results were reproduced in a 2018-19 Canadian study, suggesting that the presence of nocturnists did not affect patient outcomes.

In a 2020 survey of 20,744 internal medicine residents, it was found that more residents reported receiving adequate supervision when nocturnists were present, although the reported percentage was rather low, with the authors speculating this is due to the variable implementations of nocturnist occupations.

== Salary ==
According to a 2011 survey, the average salary for a nocturnist was 2.5% lower than other hospitalists, and the survey results report nocturnists were 27% less productive than other day-time physician roles as measured by work relative value units.
