= Inpatient care =

Care of patients requiring admission to hospital

Inpatient care is the care of patients whose condition requires admission to a hospital. Progress in modern medicine and the advent of comprehensive out-patient clinics ensure that patients are only admitted to a hospital when they are extremely ill or have severe physical trauma.

== Progress ==
Patients enter inpatient care mainly from previous ambulatory care such as referral from a family doctor, or through emergency medicine departments. The patient formally becomes an "inpatient" at the writing of an admission note. Likewise, it is formally ended by writing a discharge note.

=== Planning for patient discharge ===
Health care professionals involved in rehabilitation are often involved in discharge planning for patients. When considering patient discharge, there are a number of factors to take into consideration: the patient's current state, their place of residence and the type of support available. When considering the patient's current state, although the patient may be eligible for discharge it is important to examine factors such as the likelihood of re-injury to avoid higher health care costs.

Patients' homes should also be visited and examined before they are discharged from the hospital to determine any immediate challenges and corresponding goals, adaptations and assistive devices that need to be implemented. Follow-up appointments should also be coordinated with the patient prior to discharge to monitor the patient's progress as well as any potential complications that may have arisen. A 2016 Cochrane review showed some benefit to patient health when using individualized discharge planning over a standard format, though no reduction in health care costs.

== History ==
Inpatient care goes back to 230 BC in India where Ashoka founded 18 hospitals. The Romans also adopted the concept of inpatient care by building a specialized temple for sick patients in 291 AD on the island of Tiber.

It is believed the first inpatient care in North America was provided by the Spanish in the Dominican Republic in 1502; the Hospital de Jesús Nazareno in Mexico City was founded in 1524 and is still providing inpatient care.

Perhaps the most famous provider of inpatient care was Florence Nightingale who was the leading advocate for improving medical care in the mid-19th century. Nightingale gained fame and credibility during the Crimean War where she and 38 women volunteer nurses traveled to Crimea to treat wounded soldiers. During her first winter at the hospital 4077 soldiers died in the hospital there. She would use this experience to change the course of inpatient care by focusing on improving sanitary conditions and better living conditions within the hospital. Nightingale became known as "The Lady with the Lamp" and is still considered the founder of modern nursing. The Nightingale School of Nursing continues today and her image is the one depicted each year on nurses' day.

== Hospitalist medicine ==
The original model for inpatient care required a family physician to admit a patient and then make rounds and manage the patient's care during their hospital stay. That model is rapidly being replaced by hospitalist medicine a term first used by Robert Wachter in an article written for The New England Journal of Medicine in 1996.

The concept of hospitalist medicine provides around-the-clock inpatient care from physicians whose sole practice is the hospital itself. They work with the community of primary care physicians to provide inpatient care and transition patients back to the care of their primary care provider upon discharge. Using this approach, primary care physicians are no longer required to make rounds or be on call.

Today, hospitalist medicine is the fastest growing segment of medicine and is being adopted by hospitals worldwide for inpatient care.

== Common type of wards ==
- Internal medicine ward
- Surgery ward
- Intensive care unit
- Isolation ward
- Negative room pressure ward
- Cancer treatment ward
- Psychiatric ward
- Hospice

== Statistics ==
In 2011, there were approximately 39 million inpatient stays in the United States, with a national aggregate cost of $387 billion. U.S. programs Medicare and Medicaid bore responsibility for 63 percent of these total aggregate costs.

In 2011, approximately one quarter of hospital stays in the United States were in the intensive care unit; these accounted for nearly half the aggregate total hospital charges that year.

== See also ==
- Medical observation, a type of care that takes place at the hospital as an outpatient
