= Interdisciplinary bedside rounds =

Patient-centered hospital teamwork model

In the domain of hospital medicine, interdisciplinary bedside rounds are a collaborative approach to patient care that involves the participation of the bedside nurse, primary provider, and the patient. They are often joined by family members and allied health professionals such as the patient's pharmacist and case manager.

During interdisciplinary bedside rounds, these participants visit the patient's bedside together — a type of short, interdisciplinary care team meeting. The rounds are typically conducted for all of a provider's patients on a hospital unit, one after another, with each patient's primary nurse joining for his or her patients.

Unlike conventional hospital care in which medical professionals treat patients independently and with minimal coordination, Interdisciplinary Bedside Rounds aim to foster real-time collaboration by having the whole care team converge at a patient's bedside to discuss their care and discharge plans.

This approach, by design, seeks to mitigate the risks associated with uncoordinated care, such as miscommunication, oversight, errors, and delays. Research on hospital teams show that teams make fewer mistakes than do individuals, and that team members know their responsibilities and those of their team members.

== Goals ==
Interdisciplinary bedside rounds aim to achieve several healthcare goals by embedding them into daily care routines:

- Patient-centered care
- Interprofessional collaboration through interdisciplinary care planning
- Enhanced trust between care team members and an enhanced doctor-patient relationship
- Reduction of common medical errors using interdisciplinary accountability for patient safety and evidence-based medicine

== Comparison with multidisciplinary rounds and medical rounds ==
Although IBRs, multidisciplinary rounds (MDRs), and medical rounds all aspire to enhance patient outcomes through collaboration, the three models diverge in their structure, focus, and execution.

- Multidisciplinary rounds occur away from the patient's bedside, rarely include the primary bedside nurse, and usually focus on discharge coordination and select patient care topics.
- Medical rounds (also known as ward rounds or safari rounds) refer to physician-led rounds at the patient's bedside that may or may not include any other professions or disciplines. They may be conducted alone or by a team of physicians.
- Interdisciplinary bedside rounds occur at the patient's bedside, involve the primary bedside nurse, and focus on all aspects of patient care and discharge.

=== Multidisciplinary rounds (MDRs) ===
Definition: In MDRs, the healthcare team discusses patients outside the patient's presence, typically at a centralized location such as a nursing station or conference room.

Participants: MDRs are often brief "run the list" huddles between lead provider, case manager, and charge nurse, with a primary focus on discharge planning. Bedside nurses on the unit rarely attend MDRs, and if they do, they rarely have an active role.

Impact: Apart from these huddles, care providers in an MDR model largely function independently, leading to potential gaps in shared comprehension and decision-making, with different groups of health care professionals often working in isolation and with the illusion of teamwork.

Timing: MDRs can occur in the morning and/or afternoon

- Morning MDRs focus on patients to discharge that day
- Afternoon MDRs focus on patients to be discharged the following day.

The actual execution of MDRs can vary from hospital to hospital and unit to unit. There is no official academic definition of multidisciplinary rounds.

=== Medical rounds ===
Definition: In medical rounds, also known as ward rounds, attending rounds, and safari rounds, the lead provider rounds on his or her patient at the bedside. When conducted on a teaching unit with residents and interns, the focus is on medical education for the trainees.

Participants: Medical rounds can be conducted alone, or with a team of physicians, including junior doctors and medical students. If bedside nurses and other allied health professionals join, it is typically to observe and listen in.

Timing: Medical rounds typically occur in the morning

The actual execution of ward rounds can vary from hospital to hospital, unit to unit, physician to physician, and even day to day. Attending rounds have been called "The HumptyDumptification of Medical Discourse" because of the nonstandard nature of what is covered.

=== Interdisciplinary bedside rounds (IBRs) ===
In contrast, interdisciplinary bedside rounds aim to foster an integrated and collaborative approach to patient care. These rounds take place at the patient's bedside and involve the lead provider, multiple other healthcare professionals, and the patient and their family.

During IBRs, the different professions engage in a collective dialogue, fostering a more comprehensive understanding of the patient's condition, needs, and care plan. The inclusion of the patient and their family in the conversation also ensures that the care plan is tailored to the patient's needs and preferences. Inputs shared forward from multiple stakeholders are readily synthesized together to form a cohesive plan of care.

Multiple studies have found that interdisciplinary teams consistently outperform multidisciplinary teams across most evaluated metrics. However, implementing successful IBRs can be challenging, leading to mixed outcomes.

=== Comparison and consequences ===
MDRs, due to their absence of real-time, all-inclusive communication, can potentially result in missed cues, misinterpretations, and delays that negatively affect patient outcomes and satisfaction.

Conversely, IBRs aim to minimize these hazards by promoting shared decision-making, enhancing interprofessional communication, and placing the patient at the heart of their care. These factors collectively contribute to improved care coordination, patient satisfaction, and overall care outcomes.

== Implementation challenges and solutions ==
IBRs can be more challenging to implement than MDRs, and these challenges have been studied in detail. The IBR literature includes solutions that hospital units have seen work for them.

- Challenge: Creating transparency into the quality and quantity of daily IBRs to ensure accountability
- Published solution: Physicians at Berkshire Medical Center in Pittsfield, Massachusetts, reported success when adopting software to track IBR quality and quantity of care service delivery.
- Challenge: A lack of unit-oriented lead providers with most of their patients on the unit (also known as "geographic rounding)
- Published solution: Several studies describe successful implementation of geographic rounds. Bryson et al. reported improvements:
  - 87% of physicians reporting geography had a positive impact on the overall quality of care,
  - Geography increased time spent with patient/caregivers to discuss plan of care (p < 0.001),
  - Improved communication with nurses (p = 0.0009),
  - Increased sense of teamwork with nurses/case managers (p < 0.001).
- Challenge: IBRs take longer than MDRs and require more coordination to execute well.
- Published solution: Al Halabi et al reported a 22.3% reduction in rounding time by relocating patient beds to a common location. Stein et al. utilized a 'SIBR rounds manager', usually the unit charge nurse, to manage the team's progress from patient-to-patient and ensure that physicians did not waste time searching for the next nurse or for the next eligible patient.

== Structured interdisciplinary bedside rounds (SIBR rounds) ==
A well-known model of IBRs is structured interdisciplinary bedside rounds, abbreviated as SIBR rounds and pronounced "cyber."

SIBR follows a six-step process to create a shared mental model of who says what, when, and in what sequence when a care team enters the patient's room together. This structure is designed to ensure role clarity, consistency, efficiency, and sense-making.

=== History and development of SIBR ===
The concept of SIBR was developed by hospitalist and quality expert Dr. Jason Stein and colleagues at Emory University Hospital in the early 2010s.

The SIBR model and its inventors have won several US national awards from the Society of Hospital Medicine and attracted international attention. The insights were recognized by the Centers for Medicare & Medicaid Services Innovation Center.

Numerous studies of various SIBR units have shown substantial improvements for clinical, throughput, cost and patient/staff experience and engagement outcomes, with some having failed to achieve desired outcomes.
