= American Board of Hospital Medicine =

The American Board of Hospital Medicine (ABHM) is physician certifying body in the United States and Canada that offers board certification in hospital medicine. It is one of the Member Boards of the American Board of Physician Specialties (ABPS), a multispecialty certifying organization. The ABHM was founded in 2009 to provide a certification pathway for physicians whose clinical work is primarily focused on the care of hospitalized patients. The board develops certification examinations and maintenance requirements for hospital medicine practitioners.

== History ==
The ABHM is North America's first and only board of certification devoted exclusively to hospital medicine founded by hospitalists and governed by hospitalists.

According to ABHM Chair, Dr. Thomas G. Pelz, a hospital based physician at Boscobel (Wisconsin) Area Health Care, "The American Board of Physician Specialties recognizes the vital role that hospitalists play in the delivery of health care in the United States and Canada. Hospital medicine is one of the fastest growing and most dynamic medical specialties in North America and the ABPS is excited about taking the lead in the formation of the American Board of Hospital Medicine." Canadian ABHM board member, Dr. Luay Dindo of Surrey, British Columbia, said, "The ABHM is not a subspecialty of another board of certification but a fully fledged, comprehensive board in hospital medicine. I believe that hospital medicine is its own specialty and necessitates a board of certification reflecting that fact."

=== Governance ===
The ABHM's founding American and Canadian physician leaders represent Diplomates from the American Board of Physician Specialties (ABPS), the American Board of Medical Specialties (ABMS), and the American Osteopathic Association Bureau of Osteopathic Specialists (AOABOS).

=== Parent organization ===
In its 58th year, the American Association of Physician Specialists, Inc. (AAPS), and its official certifying body, the American Board of Physician Specialties (ABPS), is one of three nationally recognized multispecialty medical organizations overseeing physician certification. It assists its 15 Member Boards in their efforts to develop and implement educational and professional standards for the evaluation and certification of physician specialists. The AAPS is a not-for-profit organization headquartered in Tampa, Florida.
