= Mary Dixon-Woods =

Social scientist

Mary Dixon-Woods is a social scientist who researches quality and safety in healthcare. She is a professor of healthcare improvement studies at the department of public health and primary care at the University of Cambridge, where she is also director of the Healthcare Improvement Studies Institute (THIS Institute), and a fellow of Homerton College, Cambridge. Dixon-Woods was the co-editor-in-chief of BMJ Quality & Safety from 2011 to 2020.

== Early life and education ==
Dixon-Woods has described how she was "very lucky to attend a very forward-thinking secondary school in the middle of Ireland."

It was while spending four years working as a civil servant in Dublin that Dixon-Woods became very interested in how to communicate research and make it useful.

Dixon-Woods studied for a postgraduate MSc in social research and social policy, followed by a DPhil in social studies, at the University of Oxford; this is purportedly when Dixon-Woods was inspired to work in health.

== Career ==
Dixon-Woods has been elected as a fellow of the Academy of Social Sciences and the Academy of Medical Sciences. She was awarded honorary fellowship of the Royal College of Physicians in 2018.

For 22 years (1994-2016) she was based at the University of Leicester, latterly (2007-2016) as professor of medical sociology and director of the SAPPHIRE group in the department of health sciences.

In 2012 she became one of the first recipients of a Wellcome Trust Senior Investigator Award, to study ethics of patient safety and quality in healthcare. The Wellcome Trust's Investigator Awards in Humanities and Social Science are intended to enable scholars to pursue individual, bold visions with greater flexibility.

In 2016 Dixon-Woods was appointed the RAND Professor of Health Services Research at University of Cambridge. In 2018, she became Health Foundation Professor of Healthcare Improvement Studies. She served on the National Advisory Group on the Safety of Patients in England, which produced the Berwick report in 2013.

Dixon-Woods also served on the review of information technology in the NHS led by Bob Wachter, which reported in 2016.

Since 2026 Dixon-Woods has been a Fellow of Downing College, Cambridge.

She was appointed as a National Institute for Health Research Senior Investigator in 2018.

=== The Healthcare Improvement Studies Institute ===
In 2017 Dixon-Woods led a successful bid from the University of Cambridge to the Health Foundation to establish and run a new institute designed to work towards strengthening the evidence-base for ways to improve healthcare. The award of over £40m was the single largest grant awarded by the charity to date. Dixon-Woods stated at the time:

"The NHS, like health systems around the world, is faced with pressing challenges of quality and safety. Yet the science of how to make improvements has remained under-developed. This funding is a tremendous opportunity to produce new knowledge about how to improve care, experience and outcomes for patients. Together with our partners, the University of Cambridge is hugely excited at the chance to work with NHS staff, patients and carers to identify, design and text improvements."
