= Neurocritical Care Society =

International medical organization

The Neurocritical Care Society (NCS) is an international, multidisciplinary medical society first established in 2002. The Society is dedicated to improving the care and outcomes of patients with life-threatening neurologic illnesses in the intensive care unit. Common illnesses requiring neurocritical care include ischemic stroke, subarachnoid hemorrhage, intracranial hemorrhage, traumatic brain and spinal cord injury, coma, and status epilepticus. Its members are health professionals providing care to critically ill and injured patients. The Society supports research and education, and advocates on issues related to neurointensive care, neurocritical care, and general critical care.

The society's headquarters is located in Chicago, Illinois. Although a great percentage of the members are healthcare practitioners are in the US, the society is international and includes members from multiple healthcare disciplines all over the world

== History ==
The Neurocritical Care Society was formed in 2002 with Thomas P Bleck as the founding president. It has expanded to a current membership in excess of 1000 members. NCS is an interdisciplinary society, with membership roles spanning multiple physician disciplines, nursing, advanced practice providers, pharmacists and other allied health providers who specialize in the care of patients with severe neurological illness. In the early years, the path to physician board certification in neurocritical care often involved dual residency training in neurology as well as internal medicine because critical care experience was not available to neurology residents. Fellowship training in neurocritical care now constitutes a minimum of two years with focused training in general critical care and neurologic critical care. Neurocritical care as a subspecialty was accepted in the US by the United Council of Neurological Subspecialties (UCNS) in 2006. The first neurocritical care board examination was held in 2007, and currently there are over 1000 certified diplomates. The American Board of Medical Specialties approved a subspecialty certification examination in neurocritical care in 2019, to be administered by the American Board of Psychiatry and Neurology. Diplomates of the member boards in neurology, neurological surgery, anesthesiology, emergency medicine, surgery, and internal medicine with the requisite training or experience in neurocritical care will be eligible to sit for the inaugural examination in 2021.

== Guidelines ==
The Neurocritical Care Society has published multiple evidence-based, peer-reviewed scientific guidelines on the management of different disease states within neurocritical care that are available for medical practitioners worldwide.

== Publications ==
The Neurocritical Care Society began publication of the Neurocritical Care Journal in Spring 2004, with Eelco Wijdicks as the editor-in-chief. Michael Diringer is the current editor-in-chief.

Additional NCS publications include:

- The Practice of Neurocritical Care textbook
- New Science (NEWS) newsletter
- A Guide to Traumatic Brain Injury
