= BMJ Quality & Safety =

- Discipline: Health sciences
- Language: English
- Edited by: Bryony Dean Franklin and Eric J Thomas

Publication details
- Former names: Quality in Health Care, Quality & Safety in Health Care
- History: 1992-present
- Publisher: BMJ Publishing Group
- Frequency: Monthly
- Impact factor: 6.8 (2025)

Standard abbreviations
- ISO 4: BMJ Qual. Saf.

Indexing
- ISSN: 2044-5415 (print); 2044-5423 (web)
- LCCN: 2011204384
- OCLC no.: 711835066

Links
- Journal homepage; Online access; Online archive

BMJ Quality & Safety is a peer-reviewed healthcare journal dealing with improving patient safety and quality of care. The journal was established in 1992 as Quality in Health Care (print: ISSN 1475-3898, online: ISSN 1475-3901), subsequently became Quality & Safety in Health Care and obtained its current name in 2011. It co-owned with the Health Foundation and is published by BMJ Publishing Group. The editor-in-chief role is shared by Bryony Dean Franklin (UCL School of Pharmacy) and Eric J Thomas (University of Texas Health Science Center at Houston). Before them the co-editors in chief were Kaveh Shojania (Sunnybrook Health Sciences Centre) and Mary Dixon-Woods (University of Cambridge).

== Abstracting and indexing ==
The journal is abstracted and indexed by Index Medicus/MEDLINE/PubMed, Current Contents, and Excerpta Medica/EMBASE.
