= Proceduralist =

Broad term for a physician

Proceduralist is the broad term for a physician, usually a specialist or subspecialist who performs different diagnostic or therapeutic procedures.

Depending on the type of procedure, this is commonly referring to a:

- Surgeon (for surgical procedures)
- Interventional radiologist (for radiologically guided procedures)
- Gastroenterologist (for endoscopic investigations / therapies)
- Respiratory physician (for bronchoscopy)
- Cardiologist (for coronary angiography)

It may also be used to refer to any other provider of a procedure, even when it may not be their primary role (e.g. an intensivist inserting a central venous line, or a psychiatrist performing electroconvulsive therapy.)

Proceduralists, regardless of their specific specialty, are commonly responsible for obtaining informed consent from the patient for the intervention they will receive, performing the procedure, and often care following completion of the intervention. Most procedures are facilitated by sedation or anaesthesia to ensure a patient remains comfortable and physiologically supported, thus the proceduralist is required to work alongside an anaesthesiologist or another provider with experience with anaesthesia to ensure the success of the procedure. Additionally, they are often assisted by other medical or nursing staff to perform the procedure.

== Clinical procedure safety ==
The use of the term proceduralist is often used in outlining procedures for ensuring patient safety in any invasive procedure, regardless of the exact type.

The proceduralist would be expected to participate and lead a procedural time out, often guided by a checklist such as the WHO Surgical Safety Checklist. This includes ensuring the patient identity, the nature and site of the procedure, noting any allergies or any other major procedural risks and ensuring the team is briefed and ready to proceed.
