= Neurohospitalist =

Neurohospitalist is a term used for physicians interested in inpatient neurological care. It is an emerging subspecialty of neurology and a growing branch of neurology-internal medicine cross-functional care.
