= Lee Goldman =

American cardiologist and educator

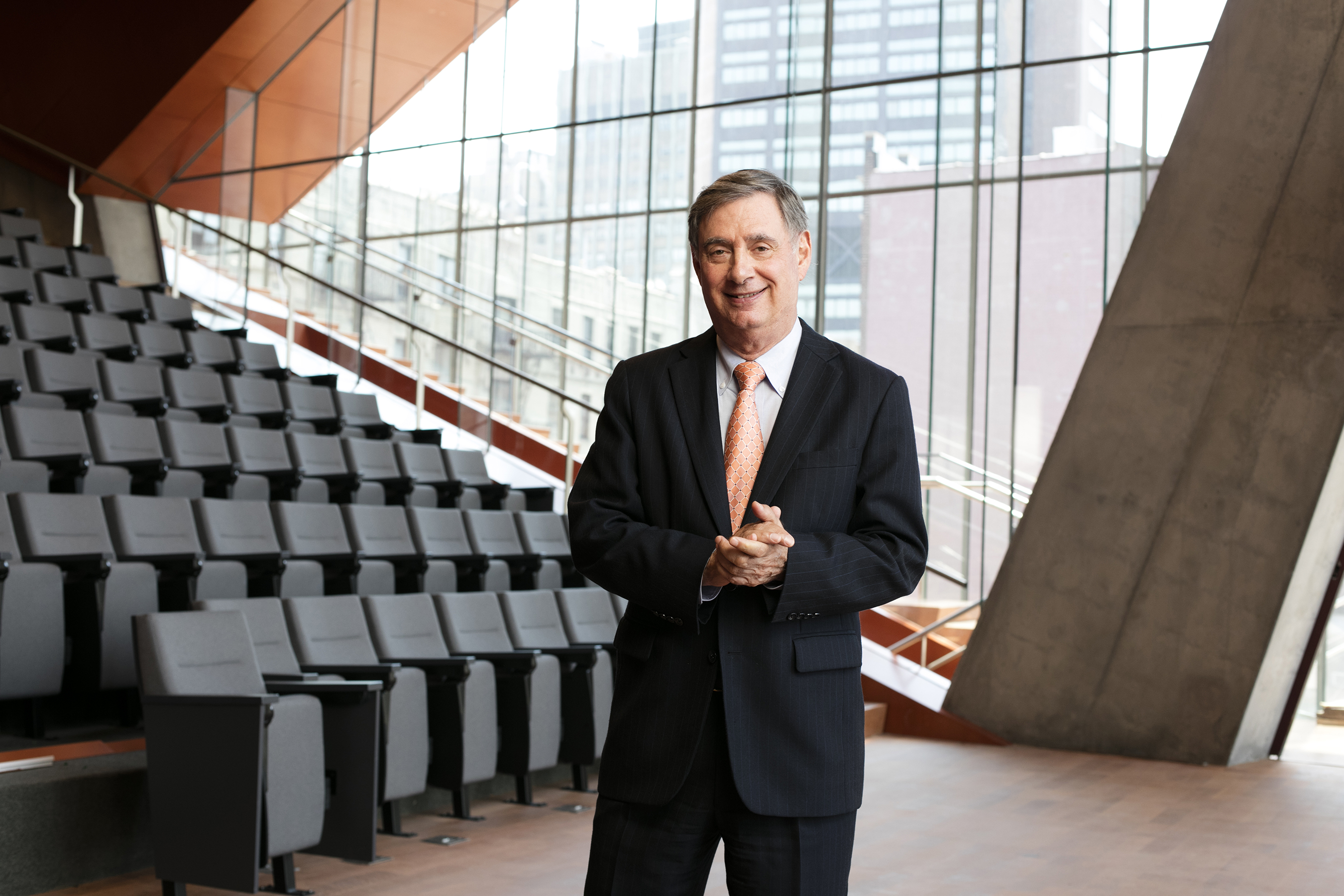
- Born: January 6, 1948 (age 78); Philadelphia, PA
- Education: Yale University (AB); Yale University (MD); Yale University (MPH)
- Medical career
- Field: Cardiology
- Institutions: Columbia University Irving Medical Center; University of California, San Francisco (UCSF); Massachusetts General Hospital; Yale University
- Awards: Glaser Award (2002); John Phillips Award (2007); Williams Award (2009); Blake Award (2002)

Lee Goldman is an American cardiologist and educator at Columbia University, where he is a professor of medicine at the Vagelos College of Physicians and Surgeons, professor of epidemiology at the Mailman School of Public Health, and dean emeritus of the Faculties of Health Sciences and Medicine. From 2006 to 2020 he served as executive vice president and dean of the Faculties of Health Sciences and Medicine, chief executive officer of the Columbia University Irving Medical Center, and Harold and Margaret Hatch Professor of the university. Before moving to Columbia, he was chair of the department of medicine at the University of California, San Francisco. He received his B.A., M.D., and M.P.H. degrees from Yale University.

Goldman is a fellow and former president of the Association of American Physicians, a member of the National Academy of Medicine, and the American Society for Clinical Investigation, as well as a fellow of the American College of Cardiology and the American Association for the Advancement of Science. He is the lead editor of Goldman-Cecil Medicine, and was a recipient of the John Phillips Award, the highest award given by the American College of Physicians.

On June 30, 2020, Goldman stepped down from his administrative positions at Columbia. He remains on the faculty of Columbia's Vagelos College of Physicians and Surgeons, where he is a professor of medicine, and of its Mailman School of Public Health, where he is a professor of epidemiology.

== Research ==
Goldman is a physician and researcher, specializing in cardiology. His research has focused on the cost and effectiveness of diagnostic and therapeutic strategies for heart disease.

In 1977, Goldman created the "Goldman Index," which is used by cardiologists as a means of evaluating the cardiac risk of non-cardiac surgery. He later developed the "Goldman Criteria," a set of guidelines that help healthcare workers determine which patients with chest pain require hospital admission.

In 1987, Goldman established the Coronary Heart Disease Policy Model, a computer simulation model which has been influential in helping cardiologists to set priorities for preventing and treating coronary disease.

At Harvard, Goldman and his colleagues started one of the first chest pain evaluation units. Today, these are common at many hospitals around the U.S.

== Columbia University Irving Medical Center ==
Goldman served as the chief executive officer of the Columbia University Irving Medical Center and dean of the Faculties of Health Sciences and Medicine at Columbia University Vagelos College of Physicians and Surgeons for 14 years between 2006 and 2020.

During Goldman's tenure, Columbia became the first medical school to eliminate all need-based loans and replace them with scholarships.

Goldman oversaw the opening of the Vagelos Education Center, a new state-of-the-art medical and graduate education building, Haven Plaza, a new outdoor pedestrian plaza open to the public created by closing off a block of Haven Avenue, and a new clinical practice in midtown Manhattan.

Goldman helped grow Columbia's research impact by starting several research initiatives including in immunology, stem cell biology, genomics, structural biology, and computational biology. In 2019, Columbia University Irving Medical Center was ranked No. 1 healthcare institution for research by the Nature Index, an annual calculation of research citations.

== Awards ==
- Glaser Award (Society of General Internal Medicine)
- John Phillips Award (American College of Physicians)
- Williams Award (Association of Professors of Medicine)
- Blake Award (Association of American Physicians)

== Honors ==
- Member of the American Society for Clinical Investigation
- Past President of the Association of American Physicians
- Past President of the Society of General Internal Medicine
- Past President of the Association of Professors of Medicine
- Fellow of the American Association for the Advancement of Science
- Past director of the American Board of Internal Medicine
- Member of the National Academy of Medicine

== Selected publications ==
- Goldman, Lee, Braunwald, Eugene (2003). Primary care cardiology. Philadelphia: W. B. Saunders. ISBN 978-0-7216-9444-3. OCLC 1159853016.
- Too Much of a Good Thing
- Goldman, Lee, Schafer, Andrew I (2020). Goldman-Cecil medicine. Philadelphia. ISBN 978-0-323-53266-2. OCLC 1118693594.
