= Robert M. Wachter =

American physician

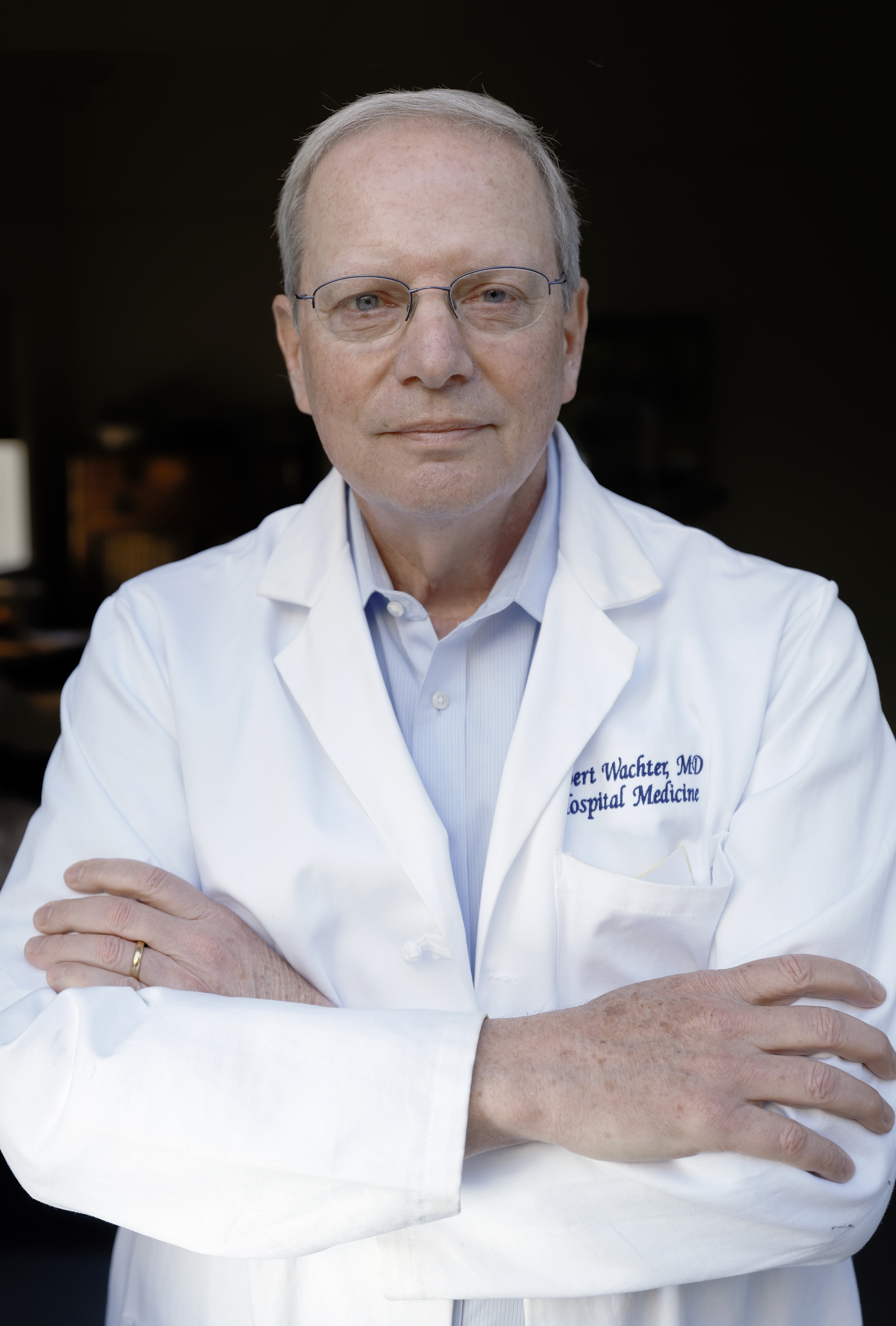
- Born: 1957 (age 68–69); New York City, New York, US
- Education: University of Pennsylvania, B.A., University of Pennsylvania Perelman School of Medicine, MD
- Spouse: Katie Hafner (m. 2012)
- Scientific career
- Workplaces: University of California, San Francisco

Robert M. "Bob" Wachter is an academic physician and author. He is on the faculty of University of California, San Francisco, where he is chairman of the Department of Medicine, the Lynne and Marc Benioff Endowed Chair in Hospital Medicine, and the Holly Smith Distinguished Professor in Science and Medicine. He is generally regarded as the academic leader of the hospitalist movement, the fastest growing specialty in the history of modern medicine. He and a colleague, Lee Goldman, are known for coining the term "hospitalist" in a 1996 New England Journal of Medicine article.

His 2015 book, The Digital Doctor: Hope, Hype, and Harm at the Dawn of Medicine's Computer Age, was a New York Times bestseller. His new book, A Giant Leap: How AI is Transforming Healthcare and What That Means for Our Future, was published by Portfolio/Penguin in 2026.

== Education ==
Wachter attended college and medical school at the University of Pennsylvania. He completed a residency and chief residency in internal medicine at UCSF, then was a Robert Wood Johnson Clinical Scholar in Health Policy, Ethics, and Epidemiology at Stanford University. He joined the faculty at UCSF in 1990.

In 2011, Wachter studied patient safety and hospital medicine at Imperial College London as a Fulbright Scholar. He was a visiting scholar at the Harvard Chan School of Public Health in 2015, where he studied and wrote about the digital transformation of healthcare.

== COVID-19 pandemic ==
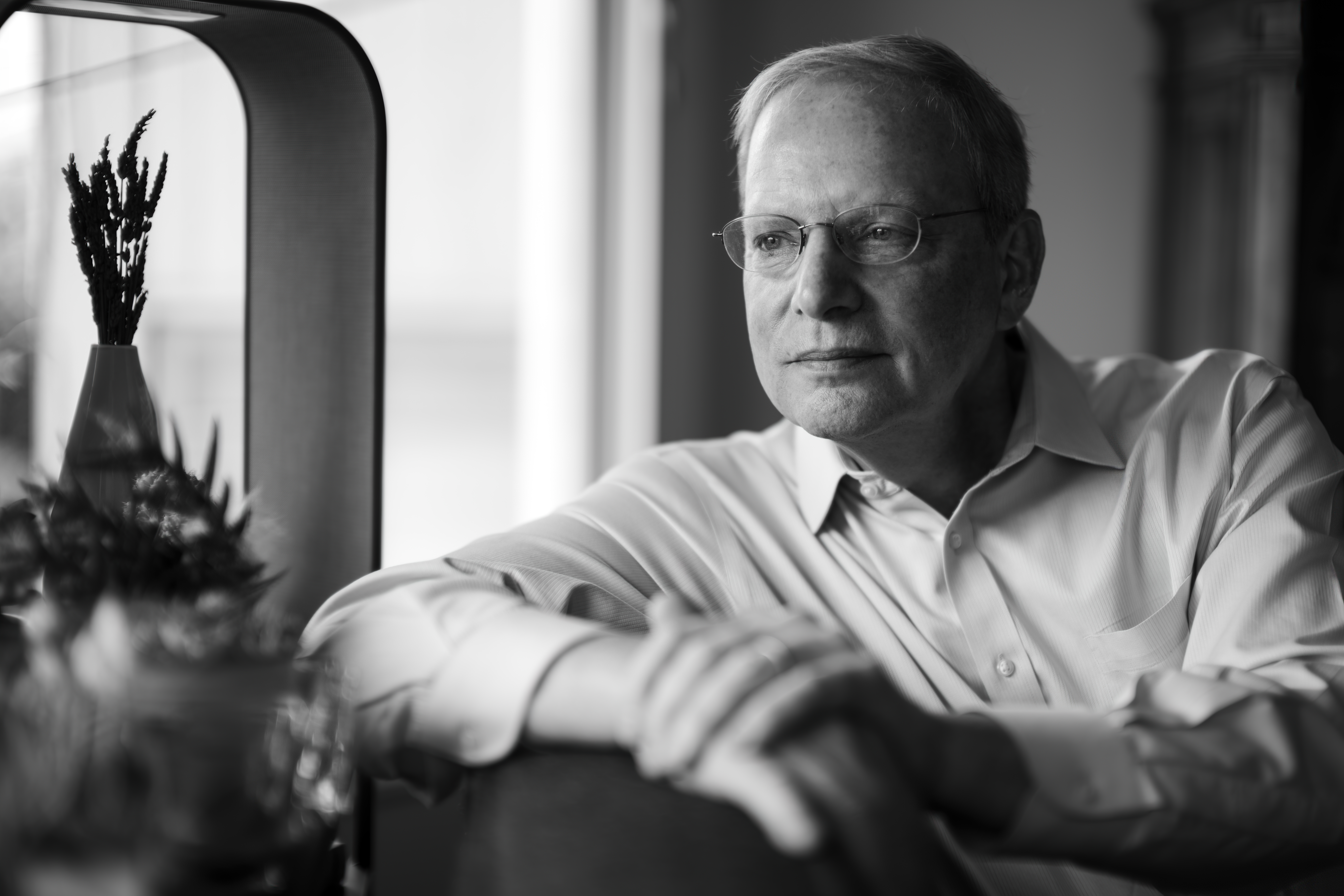
Wachter at his home in 2021

During the COVID-19 pandemic, Wachter gained attention for his posts on Twitter. His tweets on COVID-19 were viewed over 300 million times by more than 250,000 followers and served, for some, as a trusted source of information on the clinical, public health, and policy issues surrounding the pandemic.

== Honors ==
His honors include selection as the most influential physician-executive in the United States (Modern Healthcare magazine, 2015), the John M. Eisenberg award (nation’s top honor in patient safety, 2004), and election to the National Academy of Medicine (2020). He is also a Master of the American College of Physicians.

== Books ==
- "A Giant Leap: How AI is Transforming Healthcare and What That Means for Our Future" (2026)
- "The Digital Doctor: Hope, Hype, and Harm at the Dawn of Medicine's Computer Age" (2015)
- "Understanding Patient Safety, 3rd Edition" (2017; with Kiran Gupta)
- Internal Bleeding: The Truth Behind America's Terrifying Epidemic of Medical Mistakes (2005; with Kaveh Shojania)
