= David Nash (physician) =

American physician, scholar and public health expert

David B. Nash is an American physician, scholar and public health expert, known to be Founding Dean Emeritus, and named chair Professor of Health Policy at the Jefferson College of Population Health. Noted for his academic work to promote public accountability for clinical research outcomes, Nash is also a known voice on population health policies. He has authored hundreds of peer-reviewed scientific articles, published many books on healthcare subjects, and acted as a chief editor in several medical journals.

== Career ==
Nash graduated as a medical doctor from the University of Rochester (1977-1981). In the following decade he pursued clinical training, research, and teaching at several medical centers including the University of Pennsylvania Hospital (1981-1984), the Robert Wood Johnson Foundation, the Wharton School of the University of Pennsylvania (1984 to 1986), and the University of Pennsylvania Medical School, where he was a faculty member from 1986 to 1990.

Nash joined the Jefferson Medical College in 1990, to be named Dean of the Jefferson College of Population Health in 2008, a position that he occupied until his voluntary resignment in 2019, to remain its Founding Dean Emeritus. At Jefferson he is also Dr. Raymond C. & Doris N. Grandon Professor of Health Policy and Special Assistant at Jefferson Health.

Nash is board certified in Internal Medicine at both NBME and ABIM, and completed an MBA at the University of Pennsylvania.

Referred as a leader in the field, Nash's advocacy has focused on promoting accountability, professional autonomy, and training the coming generation of leaders to improve health care. His postulates on population health issues have often sparked public interest. Media reporters have noted Nash's beliefs that "factors like behavior, genetics, and environment are more important than medicine in determining a person's health".

Along his long-standing career, Nash has exerted multiple governance responsibilities for organizations in the public and private sectors. Among many others, such positions have included memberships of the National Quality Forum Task Force on Improving Population Health, and the American Association for Physician Leadership in Tampa, Fla., as well as serving on the boards of the Geisinger Commonwealth School of Medicine, the American Medical Group Association Foundation Board in Arlington, Va., and Humana, Inc Honors received by Nash include an honorary doctorate by Salus University in Philadelphia.

Nash has been a chief editor of Annals of Internal Medicine, American Journal of Medical Quality, and Population Health Management.

== Works ==
=== Scientific articles ===
Nash has published over four hundred academic papers. His research interests comprehend a wide scope within healthcare. Frequent topics in his most cited papers have been coronary bypass surgery, upper respiratory infections, clinical practice assessment, urinary tract infection, and migraine treatment outcome.

=== Editorials ===
Through his writings of editorial articles and other means, for years Nash has been an advocate on many debated subjects in healthcare, including the social determinants of success, consumer's decision-making, the upscaling of services, Israel's public system as a model, and others.

=== Books ===
As an author, Nash has published a number of books on healthcare subjects, below a partial list:

- Future Practice Alternatives in Medicine, 1993
- The Physician's Guide to Managed Care, 1994
- Connecting with the New Healthcare Consumer: Defining Your Strategy, 2001
- The Quality Solution: The Stakeholder's Guide to Improving Health Care, 2005, coauthored with Neil I. Goldfarb
- Health Care Quality: The Clinician's Primer, 2012, group coauthorship
- Demand Better! Revive Our Broken Healthcare, 2011, coauthored with Sanjaya Kumar
- The Healthcare Quality Book: Vision, Strategy, and Tools, Fourth Edition, 2019
- Population Health: Creating a Culture of Wellness, Third edition, 2019

Nash has also contributed chapters to a number of other medical books.
