= Dana Gelb Safran =

American public health expert

- Education: Harvard T.H. Chan School of Public Health; Wesleyan University
- Scientific career
- Workplaces: National Quality Forum; Tufts University School of Medicine
- Thesis: Managing chronic conditions : patient, provider and system (1992)

Dana Gelb Safran is an American public health expert who is president and chief executive officer of the National Quality Forum. She looks to use science to improve the quality, outcomes and affordability of care. She was elected to the National Academy of Medicine in 2024.

== Early life and education ==
Safran studied biology at Wesleyan University. She was a doctoral researcher at the Harvard T.H. Chan School of Public Health. Her PhD explored how patients, providers and healthcare systems can better manage chronic conditions.

== Research and career ==
Safran spent ten years at the Blue Cross Blue Shield of Massachusetts, where she developed the alternative quality contract. Working with Amazon, Berkshire Hathaway and JPMorgan Chase, Safran developed initiatives to improve the health outcomes and care experiences of patients.

In 2021, Safran was elected president and chief executive officer of the National Quality Forum. The NQF look to evaluate the scientific and clinical merits of healthcare quality measures, and advises Medicare and Medicaid.

In 2024, Safran was elected to the National Academy of Medicine.

== Selected publications ==
- T. O. Tengs; M. E. Adams; J. S. Pliskin; D. G. Safran; J. E. Siegel; M. C. Weinstein; J. D. Graham (1 June 1995). "Five-hundred life-saving interventions and their cost-effectiveness". Risk Analysis. 15 (3): 369–390. doi:10.1111/j.1539-6924.1995.tb00330.x. ISSN 1539-6924. PMID 7604170. Wikidata Q34299363.
- D G Safran; D. A. Taira; W. H. Rogers; M. Kosinski; J. E. Ware; A. R. Tarlov (1 September 1998). "Linking primary care performance to outcomes of care". Journal of Family Practice. 47 (3): 213–220. ISSN 0094-3509. PMID 9752374. S2CID 6884141. Wikidata Q77346017.
- Karen Luxford; Dana Gelb Safran; Tom Delbanco (16 May 2011). "Promoting patient-centered care: a qualitative study of facilitators and barriers in healthcare organizations with a reputation for improving the patient experience" (PDF). International Journal for Quality in Health Care. 23 (5): 510–515. doi:10.1093/intqhc/mzr024. ISSN 1353-4505. PMID 21586433. Wikidata Q51867051.
