= Joy Buba =

American sculptor and illustrator

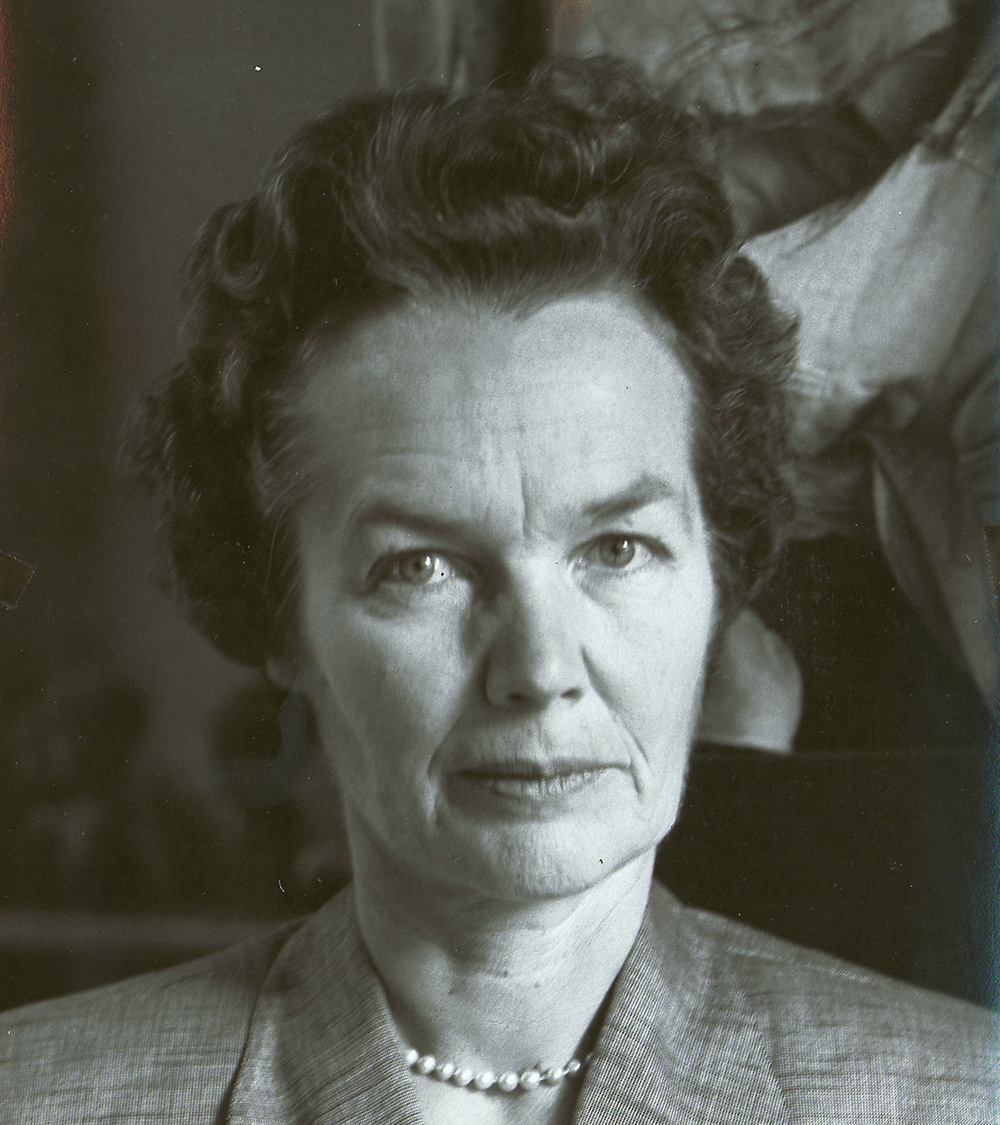
- Born: Margret Joy Flinsch; July 25, 1904; Lloyd's Neck, New York
- Died: February 11, 1998 (aged 93); Black Mountain, North Carolina
- Known for: Sculpture
- Notable work: Florence R. Sabin
- Elected: National Sculpture Society

Margret Joy Flinsch Buba (25 July 1904 — 11 February 1998) was an American sculptor and illustrator. Throughout her career, Buba created sculptures of American and European people including United States Secretary of War Henry L. Stimson, Chancellor of Germany Konrad Adenauer and Pope Paul VI. Buba's works have been held in various locations including the National Portrait Gallery, National Statuary Hall and the Vatican Library. Outside of sculpting, Buba was an illustrator and primarily drew children's books illustrations for author Herbert Zim.

== Early life and education ==
Buba was born on 25 July 1904 in Lloyd's Neck, New York. She began her sculpting career at the age of six and her art training when she was nine years old. After studying in the Greenwich Village of New York City, Buba went to the Städelschule and the Academy of Fine Arts, Munich in Germany for further education.

== Career ==
Buba initially started drawing artworks of animals before moving to human sculptures. During Buba's career, multiple of her sculptures have been held at the National Portrait Gallery in Washington D.C. including Henry L. Stimson, Norman Thomas and Margaret Sanger. In 1959, her statue of Florence R. Sabin was chosen as part of the National Statuary Hall. Apart from the United States, Buba's European sculptures include German Chancellor Konrad Adenauer and Pope Paul VI, which is located at the Vatican Library.

Outside of sculpture, Buba illustrated lecturers at the Naturmuseum Senckenberg as a teenager before resuming her work in New York. Buba's first book illustrations were published in two editions of Proboscidea by Henry Fairfield Osborn in 1936 and 1942. After drawing for the adult fiction book Written in Sand by Josephine Young Case in 1945, Buba primarily illustrated children's books written by Herbert Zim throughout the 1940s and 1950s, including Goldfish, Rabbits, and Frogs and Toads. Her final children's book illustrations were in Elizabeth Vincent Foster's 1970 book Lyrico: The Only Horse of His Kind.

== Methodology ==
Through her sculptures, Buba's primary objective was to focus on "the quintessence of the person". To fulfill her goal, Buba focused on the facial shadows that were presented during conversations with her live models.

== Awards and honors ==
Buba was a Fellow of the National Sculpture Society.

== Death ==
Buba died on 11 February 1998 in Black Mountain, North Carolina.
