= Florence R. Sabin =

American medical scientist (1871–1953)

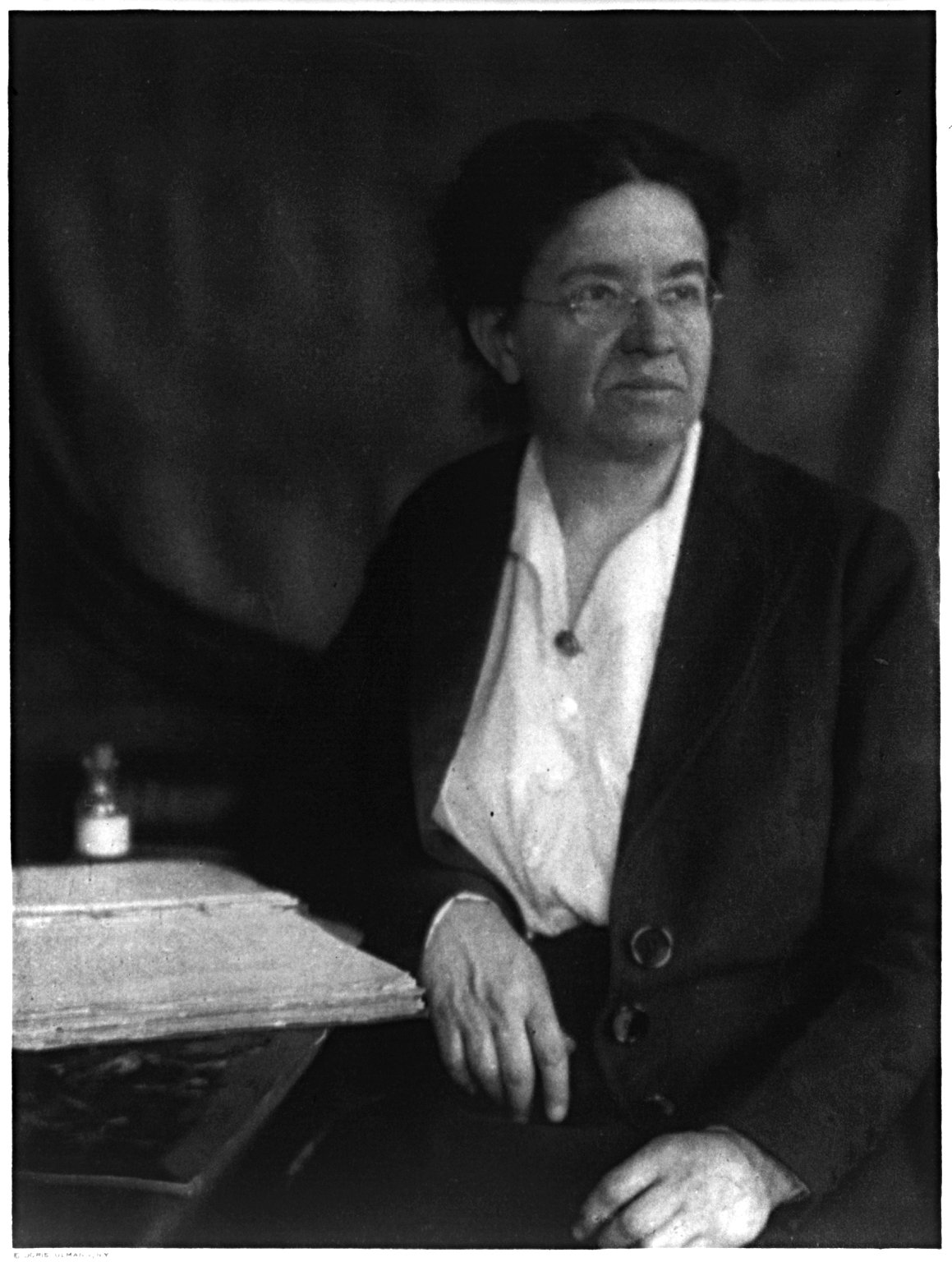
- Florence R. Sabin
- Born: Florence Rena Sabin; November 9, 1871; Central City, Colorado Territory
- Died: October 3, 1953 (aged 81); Denver, Colorado, U.S.
- Education: Smith College (B.S., 1893); Johns Hopkins University School of Medicine (M.D., 1900)
- Known for: Research on the lymphatic system; modernization of Colorado public health (“Sabin Health Laws”)
- Awards: Albert Lasker Public Service Award (1951)
- Scientific career
- Fields: Anatomy; medical research; public health
- Workplaces: Johns Hopkins School of Medicine; Rockefeller Institute for Medical Research

Signature
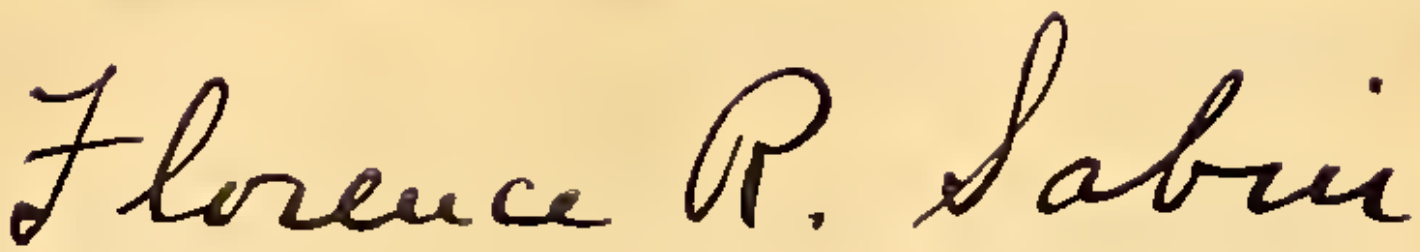

Florence Rena Sabin (November 9, 1871 – October 3, 1953) was an American physician and medical scientist known for pioneering work on the development of the lymphatic system and for later transforming public health in Colorado. She was the first woman to hold a full professorship at the Johns Hopkins School of Medicine, the first woman elected to the National Academy of Sciences, and the first woman to head a department at the Rockefeller Institute for Medical Research. During retirement she led a public-health reform campaign in Colorado that produced the “Sabin Health Laws”; in 1951 she received the Albert Lasker Public Service Award for her public-health work.

== Early life ==
On November 9, 1871, Serena Sabin gave birth to her youngest daughter, Florence Rena Sabin, in Central City, Colorado. Florence's mother was a schoolteacher who later died from puerperal fever (sepsis) in 1878. Her father, George K. Sabin, was a mining engineer living and working on site with his family. Shortly after her mother's death, Florence and her sister (Mary) moved in with their Uncle Albert in Chicago before relocating to Vermont with their paternal grandparents.

Uncle Albert was a tremendous influence on Florence, and from her relationship with him, she developed a love of nature and a keen interest in books and music. The Sabin girls soon moved with their uncle to an old family farm in Vermont.

Florence became very interested in the life story of Levi Sabin, an ancestor who had graduated from medical school in 1798. Florence's father had always wanted to be a doctor, but the obligations of mining overwhelmed him, and his thoughts of a medical career slowly disappeared. But Florence began to secretly harbor her father's dream. In 1885 Florence enrolled at Vermont Academy (and graduated in 1889), where her scientific interests were finally allowed to develop.

Throughout her childhood Sabin had intentions of becoming a pianist. However, she was never notably talented musically, which led her to shift her focus during her time at Vermont Academy, Saxtons River, Vermont, to a future in science.

== Higher education ==
Sabin earned her bachelor's degree from Smith College in 1893. For two years she taught high school mathematics in Denver, followed by one year of zoology at Smith, as a means to finance her first year of graduate school.

In 1896, Sabin enrolled at Johns Hopkins University School of Medicine as one of fourteen women in her class. The school opened in 1893 and was co-ed from the beginning because of an early donor's contingency which required the admittance of female students.

While at Hopkins, Sabin's observational skills and perseverance in the laboratory caught anatomist Franklin P. Mall's attention. Mall inspired Sabin by helping narrow her focus onto two projects well regarded by scientists and foundational to her future research and consequent legacy. The first project was to produce a three-dimensional model of a newborn baby's brain stem, which became the focus of the textbook An Atlas of the Medulla and Midbrain (1901). The second project involved the embryological development of the lymphatic system which asserted that the lymphatic system is formed from the embryo's blood vessels and not other tissues.

Sabin graduated from Johns Hopkins University School of Medicine in 1900.

== Professional life ==
=== Johns Hopkins University School of Medicine (1902-1925) ===
Upon graduation, Sabin obtained an internship at Johns Hopkins Hospital under physician Sir William Osler. Following a one-year internship with Osler, she won a research fellowship in the Department of Anatomy at Johns Hopkins School of Medicine where she continued to work with Mall. Shortly thereafter, a Fellowship in the Department of Anatomy at Johns Hopkins was created for her.

In 1902 she began to teach in the Department of Anatomy at Johns Hopkins. By 1905 she was promoted to associate professor and finally appointed professor of embryology and histology in June 1917, the first woman to become a full professor at a medical college.

At Hopkins she continued her research on the origins of blood, blood vessels, blood cells, the histology of the brain, and the pathology and immunology of tuberculosis. In 1924, Sabin's work on the origins of blood vessels earned her the 16th presidency of the Association of American Anatomists (1924-1926).

In 1925, Sabin left Johns Hopkins after completing her research amidst institutional discrimination and her desire to research full time.

=== Rockefeller Institute for Medical Research (1925-1938) ===
In September 1925 she became head of the department of cellular studies at Rockefeller Institute for Medical Research in New York City. Her research focused on the lymphatic system, blood vessels and cells, and tuberculosis.

In 1925, she was voted into the National Academy of Sciences. She was the first woman to gain membership in this prestigious body and would remain the lone female member for the next 20 years.

In 1926, she joined the research committee of the National Tuberculosis Association. The committee's purpose was to consolidate all of the tuberculosis research taking place with the hope of controlling the disease proactively. While here, Sabin devoted her research to immune cells, monocytes in particular, which developed into other cells. Sabin spent her final years at the institute determining the effects imposed by foreign substances and their consequent formation of antibodies.

In 1938, Sabin left her position at Rockefeller Institute and moved back to Colorado for retirement.

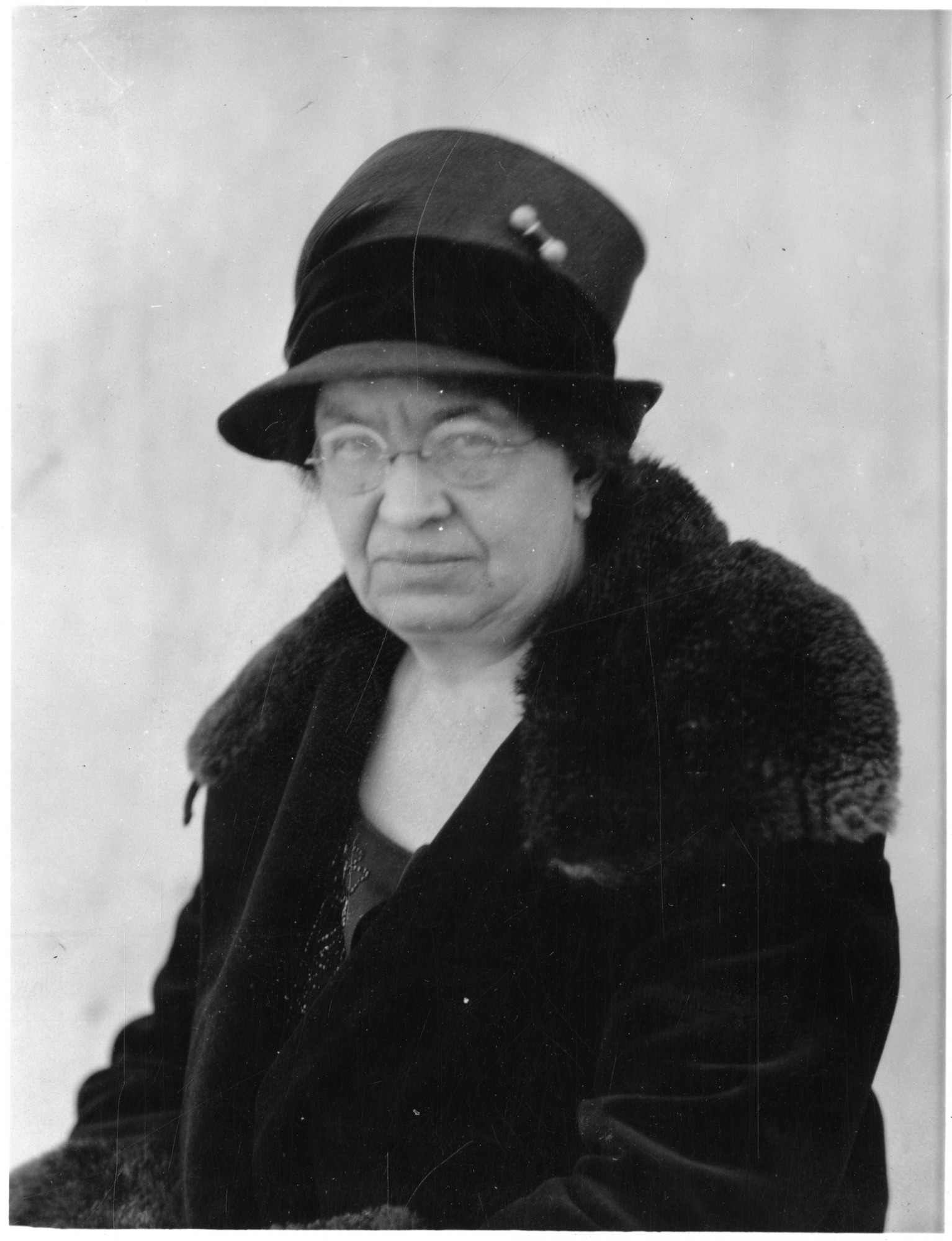
Photograph of Florence R. Sabin.

== Final years & legacy ==
After six years of quiet retirement, Sabin accepted Colorado Governor John Vivian's request to chair a subcommittee on health beginning in 1944. She presented her findings asserting that the state was “backward in regard to public health” in a letter to the Governor in April 1945. Knowing that health care legislation had been voted down consistently in the past due to uninterested politicians, she was relentless in her demand for reform.

While she was in her early seventies, Sabin refused to let a snowstorm prevent her from making it to a speech in support of her cause, despite public travel concerns. Beginning with this speech, Sabin worked to have politicians who opposed health reform defeated by those in support of it. These efforts resulted in the passing of a set of laws in her name. The “Sabin Health Laws” modernized public health in Colorado by providing more hospital beds to treat tuberculosis, resulting in significant reductions in cases.

In an address to the Illinois Statewide Health Committee in 1947, Sabin said that she was chosen as committee chair because the Governor had no interest in public health and appointed “an old lady” because he did not think she would be able to accomplish anything. In 1948 she became manager of health and charities for Denver, donating her salary over the next three years to medical research.

In 1951 Sabin retired for a second and final time, continuing to advocate for public health issues. Sabin's lifetime of service resulted in the building housing University of Colorado’s department of medicine being named the Florence R. Sabin Building for Research in Cellular Biology.

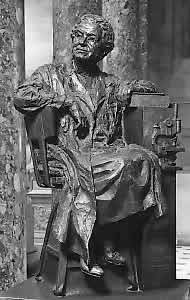
NSHC statue of Florence Sabin

Sabin died of a heart attack on October 3, 1953 (she was 81). She was cremated and her ashes were interred in the Fairmount Mausoleum at Fairmount Cemetery in Denver, Colorado.

In 1959, the state of Colorado donated a statue of Sabin to the National Statuary Hall Collection. In 1973, Sabin was inducted into the National Women's Hall of Fame, In 1985, Sabin was inducted into the Colorado Women's Hall of Fame. In 2005, Johns Hopkins University honored Sabin's legacy by naming one of the four colleges of its medical school after her.

== Research projects and papers ==
In the Johns Hopkins Medical Institutes Archives, Sabin's collection of papers and medical records from 1903 - 1941 are stored; some are even released upon request. The Sophia Smith Collection at Smith College holds many of Dr. Sabin's papers. Other collections are located in the American Philosophical Society Library in Philadelphia, the medical school of the University of Colorado, Colorado State Historical Society's Division of Museums, Rockefeller Institute, and in the Alan Mason Chesney Papers at Johns Hopkins University.

== See also ==
- Timeline of women in science

== Sources ==
- Rothe, Anna; Demarest, Helen, eds. (April 1945). "Sabine, Florence R(ena)". Current Biography. 6 (4): 43–45.
- "Florence Rena Sabin, 1951". Kappa Delta Pi. June 24, 2011. Archived from the original on June 24, 2011.
- National Library of Medicine N.D. (1923). "Changing the face of medicine: Dr. Florence R. Sabin". Journal of Medical Biography.
- Parkhurst, G. (January 1930). "Dr. Sabin, Scientist". Pictorial Review: Journal of Medical Biography: 2–3.
- National Library of Medicine (1923). "Profiles in Science: The Florence R. Sabin Papers, Smith College Alumni Questionnaire, 1923". Journal of Medical Biography.
- Bald, W. (December 1947). "She's a Bombshell at 76". New York Post.
- Wooley, Charles F (August 2005). "Florence Rena Sabin (1871-1953), William Osler (1849-1919) and tuberculosis". Journal of Medical Biography. 13 (3): 162–9. doi:10.1177/096777200501300311. PMID 16059529. S2CID 196345885.
- Sabin, F. R. (1901). "An atlas of the medulla and midbrain". Journal of Medical Biography. 65 (1678): 172. Bibcode:1901Natur..65..172G. doi:10.1038/065172b0. S2CID 43214433.
- Sabin, F.R. (September 1947). "Profiles in science. Speech read at Illinois Statewide Public Health Committee". Journal of Medical Biography.
- Smith College N.D. "Florence Rena Sabin Papers: Biographical Note". Sophia Smith CollectionJournal of Medical Biography.
- Sabin, Florence R (February 2002). "Preliminary note on the differentiation of angioblasts and the method by which they produce blood-vessels, blood-plasma and red blood-cells as seen in the living chick. 1917". J. Hematother. Stem Cell Res. 11 (1): 5–7. doi:10.1089/152581602753448496. PMID 11846999. S2CID 221400744.
- Harvey, A M (1976). "A new school of anatomy: the story of Franklin P. Mall, Florence R. Sabin, and John B. MacCallum". Johns Hopkins Med. J. Suppl.: 97–113. PMID 801553.
- McGehee Harvey, A (February 1975). "A new school of anatomy: the story of Franklin P. Mall, Florence R. Sabin and John B. MacCallum". The Johns Hopkins Medical Journal. 136 (2): 83–84. PMID 1090771.
- "Florence Rena Sabin, "First Lady" Of Colorado". JAMA. 186 (12): 1090–1. December 1963. doi:10.1001/jama.1963.03710120072019. PMID 14065365.
- "Florence R. Sabin, M.D". British Medical Journal. 2 (4843): 997–8. October 1953. doi:10.1136/bmj.2.4843.996. PMC 2029940. PMID 13094098.
- BASS, E (November 1950). "Florence Rena Sabin, M. D". Journal of the American Medical Women's Association. 5 (11): 466–7. PMID 14784430.
