= OMICS (journal) =

Peer-reviewed scientific journal

- Discipline: Integrative biology, omics
- Language: English
- Edited by: Vural Özdemir

Publication details
- History: 1995–present
- Publisher: Mary Ann Liebert
- Frequency: Monthly
- Impact factor: 3.374 (2020)

Standard abbreviations
- ISO 4: OMICS

Indexing
- ISSN: 1536-2310 (print); 1557-8100 (web)
- LCCN: 2001211764

Links
- Journal homepage; Online access

OMICS: A Journal of Integrative Biology is a peer-reviewed scientific journal of omics (e.g. genomics, proteomics, metabolomics, etc.) and integrative biology published by Mary Ann Liebert. The journal was founded in 1995 as Genome Science and Technology, changing its name to Microbial & Comparative Genomics in 1997, eventually acquiring its current title in 2004. The journal is now edited by Vural Özdemir. Since 2008 the journal has been published online only.

== Abstracting and indexing ==
The journal is abstracted and indexed in the following bibliographic databases:

- BIOSIS Previews
- Biochemistry & Biophysics Citation Index
- Biological Abstracts
- Biotechnology Citation Index
- CAB Abstracts
- Current Contents/Life Sciences
- EMBASE/Excerpta Medica
- EMBiology
- Global Health
- Journal Citation Reports/Science Edition
- MEDLINE
- ProQuest databases
- PubMed Central
- PubMed
- Science Citation Index
- Science Citation Index Expanded
- Scopus

According to Journal Citation Reports, the journal has a 2020 impact factor of 3.374.
