= HealthCorps =

American nonprofit organization

HealthCorps, Inc.
- Founded: 2003; 23 years ago
- Type: Public charity
- Purpose: Wellness education
- Location: New York City, NY
- Key people: Amy Braun, President; Michelle Marquez, Chief Operating Officer; Juliahann Washington, Controller; Karen Johnson, Chief Communications Officer
- Employees: 50+
- Website: www.healthcorps.org

HealthCorps, Inc. is an American nonprofit organization that provides school-based and organizational health education and peer mentoring, in addition to community outreach to underserved populations.

== Overview ==
HealthCorps is a national service program with tax-exempt status under Section 501(c)(3) of the Internal Revenue Code. The program claims to impact from 400 to 600 high school students per school per year.

The HealthCorps in-school program aims to support teens and pre-adolescents by providing practical life skills through interactive lessons, student-led events, and demonstrations that emphasize the importance of physical and mental well-being. HealthCorps encourages students to become informed consumers and health advocates while fostering positive behavioral changes that can improve self-esteem.

HealthCorps operates using a peer-mentor model, where the HealthCorps "coordinator" is typically a recent college graduate. Each coordinator is assigned to manage 1 to 4 schools, where they conduct lessons and activities focused on fitness, nutrition, and mental resilience. The seminars are taught through health or other academic classes or after-school clubs, as designated by the school principal. Lesson content is included in a 250-page curriculum and program guide developed in the field by the coordinators and approved by the HealthCorps Advisory Board.

== History ==
HealthCorps was designed in 2003 as a 10-month pilot in partnership with Columbia Presbyterian Hospital as a response to "Healthy People 2010", an initiative of the U.S. Department of Health and Human Services to advance a nationwide disease prevention agenda that included fighting childhood obesity. As a result, cardiothoracic surgeon Mehmet Oz and his wife, Lisa, founded the educational program based upon the pilot under the auspices of the Foundation for Advanced Cardiac Therapies ("FACT"), a Palm Beach, Florida-based 501(c)(3) organization.

In 2004, HealthCorps launched a lunchtime workshop at George Washington Educational Campus in Washington Heights, New York, led by HealthCorps coordinators–recent college graduates with an interest in health careers who serve as peer-mentors. The coordinators were trained and supervised by staff from the Touro College Children's Health Education Foundation. A second school, Cathedral High School in Manhattan, was added to the pilot in 2005. By 2006, the HealthCorps network grew to six schools in New York City as well as the Academy of the New Church in Pennsylvania, and two schools in New Jersey Cliffside Park High School and North Bergen High School.

HealthCorps chose youth as its major focus in order to maximize the impact of its programming. Teenagers are often significant family purchase influencers, family caregivers and autonomous buyers with some expendable income. They also have great capacity to influence a large network of peers.

=== Original programming and first written curriculum ===
In 2007, HealthCorps embarked on a national rollout, extending its health education and mentoring program to 36 schools, including 29 in New York City, two in New Jersey, one in Florida, and one in Pennsylvania.

HealthCorps staff and board members developed the first written curriculum, combining lessons created by the original nine coordinators with content from the YOU book series by Oz and advisory board member Michael Roizen of the Cleveland Clinic.

=== Curriculum enhancements ===
Since 2008, as HealthCorps continued to expand into more schools across the US, the curriculum has been regularly enhanced and updated. HealthCorps staff, board members, and coordinators are vital to curriculum creation and have edited lessons based on their expertise or experience in the classroom. In order to further enhance the curriculum, HealthCorps has partnered with evidence-based programs such as Atkins Nutritionals, Alliance for a Healthier Generation, Sahaja Meditation, Share our Strength/Cooking Matters, Baptiste Foundation, Smarter Lunchrooms, the Chickasaw Nation, and Recover Circle.

The HealthCorps curriculum focuses on three pillars of health: mental resilience, nutrition and fitness. It also includes lessons on a wide range of other health issues, such as bullying, family mealtimes, and diabetes.

In classrooms, coordinators lead lessons from the curriculum that introduce students to health topics though interactive activities and discussions.

On the individual level, the curriculum and activities are intended to build resilience and leadership skills as well as raise awareness of healthy behaviors and foster positive change. On the school and community level, HealthCorps programs are intended to promote positive changes to the policies, systems and environments, and to ultimately be absorbed into the culture of the community.

=== Extracurricular activities ===
In addition to teaching in classrooms, coordinators encourage learning by other activities. They plan and participate in schoolwide and community extracurricular activities such as health fairs, walking contests, staff development seminars, gardening, food demonstrations, service projects and after-school clubs (e.g. cooking, fitness and youth empowerment). HealthCorps activities challenge students to share the knowledge and skills they have learned with their friends, families and communities and to change their world for the better. School and community-wide activities are interspersed throughout the school year as a part of the HealthCorps experience to enhance lessons taught in the classroom.

=== Programming enhancements ===
In fall 2012, in response to requests from educators for training in the curriculum, HealthCorps piloted a staff training program called HealthCorps University in California with the Sacramento Unified School District. The program was chosen as one of 12 to receive pro bono consulting services to affirm its efficacy as a part of the Morgan Stanley Strategy Challenge.

=== Scale ===
Since its inception in 2003, through all of its programs (HealthCorps University and the Living Labs Regional and Single School/Site models) HealthCorps has impacted approximately 2.3 million students. To date, 400 young people have served as coordinators, the majority of whom went on to medical school. Almost 200 middle or high schools in 20 states have served as Living Labs.

=== Curriculum ===
This 5th edition of the HealthCorps curriculum was significantly enhanced as the result of a research partnership begun in 2013 in partnership with the Albert Einstein College of Medicine and Family Cook Productions. The project was funded by the National Institutes of Health through the National Institute of Diabetes and Digestive and Kidney Diseases. One of the key project objectives is to disseminate the USDA Dietary Guidelines for adolescents and utilize student leaders to share skill-based strategies for adhering to them to make these healthy behaviors more socially desirable among youth. This was accomplished in part by designing an online health behavior survey that produces a personalized assessment, or "Healthy Me Snapshot" (HMS), for each participant. The HMS identifies which dietary guideline(s) a given participant should prioritize and supports students to target this behavior by setting specific, measurable, actionable, realistic and timely ("SMART") goals. This assessment and goal-setting system has been incorporated into this edition of the HealthCorps curriculum and eight of the core lessons focus on dietary guidelines.

Coordinators in Living Lab schools around the country deliver Healthy Me Journey and administer the Healthy Me Snapshot survey to students prior to administering other chapters. Students set and work towards a health SMART goal throughout the program. Coordinators administer the Healthy Me Reflection exercise to students after they have participated in the Core Curriculum Units. Each unit of the curriculum relies on the performance indicators of the National Health Education Standards and the Characteristics of Effective Health Education, published by the Centers for Disease Control and Prevention. Most students participate in the chapter units on a weekly basis over the course of a semester.

=== Digital curriculum ===
In 2013, HealthCorps joined forces with CK-12, a nonprofit that has created a digital platform (http://www.ck12.org) providing free and customizable K-12 educational resources. HealthCorps and CK-12 envisioned their strategic partnership would increase engagement with and access to the HealthCorps free curriculum. HealthCorps's free online textbook, HealthCorps - Skills For A Healthy Me, is hosted on the site.

=== Impact ===
Studies published in BioMed Central (2018), Journal of School Health (2014), and Childhood Obesity (2011) evaluated the effects of the HealthCorps program on health knowledge and behaviors. The results identified a correlation between reduced BMI scores in obese female adolescents and the program as well as a decrease in soft drink consumption. It also found improvements in youth dieting and physical activity through the program's education on nutrition and mental health.

== Geographical reach ==
As of September 2018 HealthCorps was active in the following areas: Atlanta, Barbourville, Byng, Chickasha, Clay County, Cleveland, Corbin, Davis, Elizabeth, Houston, Jackson County, Kingston, Latta, Los Angeles, Millville, New York City, Owsley County, Oxnard, Perry County, Phoenix, Port Hueneme, Riverside, San Gorgonio, Tishomingo, Upland, West New York and West Palm Beach

Other areas in which HealthCorps has been active include: Anderson, Baltimore, Bloomington, Boston, Bridgehampton, Bryn Athyn, Canoga Park, Cathedral City, Charlotte, Clarksdale, Cliffside Park, Coachella, Crescent City, Delray Beach, Desert Hot Springs, Fresno, Hayward, Huntington Valley, Lantana, Laurel, Long Beach, Miami, New Orleans, Newark, North Bergen, Oklahoma City, Palm Beach, Palm Desert, Palm Springs, Portland, Rancho Mirage, Sacramento, San Diego, San Fernando, San Lorenzo, Shafter, Shelby, Stockton, Syosset, Tampa, Thermal, Tucson, Tucson, Washington D.C., Wellington and Wilmington
