= Zebra (disambiguation) =

Zebra is one of several species of the horse genus Equus whose members have distinctive stripes.

Zebra may also refer to:

== Entertainment ==
=== Music ===
- Zebra (American band), a hard rock/heavy metal group from 1975 to the present
  - Zebra (Zebra album), 1983
- Zebra (Yugoslav band), a rock band from 1976 to 1979
- Zebra (Jack DeJohnette album), 1989 album by jazz musician Jack DeJohnette
- Zebra (Kayah album), a 1995 album by Polish singer Kayah
- Zebra (Morandi album), expected from the Romanian Europop group
- Zebra (Yello album), 1994 electronica album
- "Zebra" (Beach House song), a 2010 song by American dream pop band Beach House
- "Zebra" (The John Butler Trio song), a 2003 song by The John Butler Trio
- Zebra Records, a record label
- Zzbra: Original Motion Picture Soundtrack, a 2012 album by Zzbra

=== Other entertainment ===
- Zebra (chess), a fairy chess piece
- Zebra (Pearls Before Swine), a comic strip character
- "Zebras" (Law & Order: Special Victims Unit), 2009
- TV 2 Zebra, a Norwegian television channel

== Technology ==
- ZEBRA (computer), an early Dutch computer
- Zebra Technologies, American manufacturer of marking, tracking, and computer printing equipment
  - Zebra (programming language), a printer description language developed by Zebra Technologies
- GNU Zebra, a network routing software package
- Zebra battery, a type of molten salt battery

== Transportation ==
- Zebra (ship), a three-masted merchant ship, built in 1818
- HMS Zebra, the name of six ships of the Royal Navy
- USS Zebra (AKN-5), a cargo ship of the United States Navy
- Daihatsu Zebra, a compact commercial vehicle
- ZAP Xebra, a light electric vehicle

== Other ==
- Zebra (medicine), American medical slang for an obscure and unlikely diagnosis
- Zebra (pen manufacturer), a Japanese manufacturer of writing instrument
- Zebra Books, an imprint of Kensington Books
- Zebra murders, a string of racially motivated murders in San Francisco, California between 1973 and 1974
- Zebra Tower, a building in Warsaw, Poland
- ZEBRA protein, of the Epstein-Barr virus
- Zebra Puzzle, a logic puzzle
- Zebra seabream, Diplodus cervinus, a species of seabream
- Diplodus hottentotus or zebra, a species of seabream

== See also ==
- Zebra Man (disambiguation)
- Zebra stripes (disambiguation)
- Zebrafish (disambiguation)
- Zebra crossing, a type of pedestrian crossing where pedestrians have priority over road traffic
- Official (gridiron football), known for wearing black and white striped uniforms
