= Mary Ann Liebert =

Company in New Rochelle, United States

- Parent company: Sage Publishing
- Founded: 1980; 46 years ago
- Founder: Mary Ann Liebert
- Country of origin: United States
- Headquarters location: New Rochelle, New York
- Distribution: Worldwide
- Publication types: Academic journals, books, and trade magazines
- No. of employees: 100 (2000)
- Official website: liebertpub.com

Mary Ann Liebert, Inc. is a publishing company founded by its president, Mary Ann Liebert, in 1980 and a subsidiary of Sage Publishing. The company publishes peer-reviewed academic journals, books, and trade magazines in the areas of biotechnology, biomedical sciences, medical research, and life sciences; clinical medicine, surgery, and nursing; technology and engineering; environmental science; public health and policy; law, regulation, and education.

The company's headquarters is in New Rochelle, New York.

The company has been described as the first to establish a specialty in genetic engineering.

== Publications ==
Eschewing traditional market research, the publisher seeks out niche topics overlooked by larger publishers. Its portfolio of more than ninety peer-reviewed journals includes:

- AIDS Research and Human Retroviruses
- Antioxidants & Redox Signaling
- Astrobiology
- Autism in Adulthood
- Breastfeeding Medicine
- Cannabis and Cannabinoid Research
- Childhood Obesity
- The CRISPR Journal
- Cyberpsychology, Behavior, and Social Networking
- DNA and Cell Biology
- Election Law Journal
- Games for Health Journal
- Genetic Engineering and Biotechnology News
- Genetic Testing and Molecular Biomarkers
- Journal of Adolescent and Young Adult Oncology
- Journal of Child and Adolescent Psychopharmacology
- Journal of Alternative and Complementary Medicine
- Journal of Computational Biology
- Journal of Correctional Health Care
- Journal of Medicinal Food
- Journal of Neurotrauma
- Journal of Palliative Medicine
- Journal of Women's Health
- LGBT Health
- Metabolic Syndrome and Related Disorders
- OMICS: A Journal of Integrative Biology
- Population Health Management
- Rejuvenation Research
- Stem Cells and Development
- Surgical Infections
- Sustainability and Climate Change
- Thyroid
- Transgender Health
- Zebrafish

Publications focused on topics outside of the medical field include Westchester Wag, which covers the social scene in Westchester County, New York, and Rinkmagazine, a skating periodical.

== History ==
The company's first publication was the Journal of Interferon Research, launched in 1981. Genetic Engineering News was launched the same year, attaining a circulation of 50,000 by 2000. The combined circulation of all titles from the publisher in 2000 was 250,000.

The company's top five publications by revenue as of 2000 were Genetic Engineering News (50,000), Westchester Wag (50,000), Journal of Women's Health and Gender-Based Medicine (5,000), Human Gene Therapy (2,300), and AIDS Research and Human Retrovirus (2,150).

In February 2018, the company launched The CRISPR Journal, a bimonthly journal devoted to research advances and commentary in the field of CRISPR and genome editing.

In December 2024, Mary Ann Liebert, Inc. was acquired by Sage Publishing. Journals would continue to be published under the Mary Ann Liebert name.

- Category:Mary Ann Liebert academic journals
