= Lisa Iezzoni =

American medical researcher

- Education: Harvard Medical School
- Scientific career
- Workplaces: Harvard University

Lisa I. Iezzoni (born 1954) is an American medical researcher with expertise in health policy. She is a professor at Harvard Medical School, and based at the Health Policy Research Center, Mongan Institute, an affiliate of Massachusetts General Hospital. She has dedicated her career to shining a light on inequities in health care among people affected with disabilities.

== Education ==
Iezzoni attended the Harvard School of Public Health in the 1970s, from which she received a master's degree in health policy. She went on to enroll in Harvard Medical School, only to be diagnosed with multiple sclerosis in her first year as a student there. She received her M.D. from Harvard Medical School in 1984. When the time came to apply for post-graduate training, Harvard Medical School refused to write her a letter of recommendation, preventing her from applying for an internship and residency program and thus from practicing medicine. She therefore became a researcher. There were extreme barriers to practicing medicine with a disability at the time (the Americans with Disabilities Act had not yet been passed).

== Career ==
Iezzoni served as an assistant professor at Boston University School of Medicine, while also working in the Health Care Research Unit there. For sixteen years, she was director of research at Beth Israel Deaconess Medical Center, where she became the first woman affiliated with the center to be appointed a professor at Harvard Medical School. In 2006, she became the associate director of Massachusetts General Hospital's Partners Institute for Health Policy (since renamed the Mongan Institute for Health Policy). She has served on many national committees and advisory boards, such as for the National Institutes of Health, National Academy of Medicine, National Quality Forum, Robert Wood Johnson Foundation Clinical Scholars program, National Committee on Vital and Health Statistics, as well as the Secretary’s Advisory Committee on National Health Promotion and Disease Prevention Objectives for 2020, which advised the U.S. Department of Health and Human Services (HHS). From 2012 to 2013, Dr. Iezzoni chaired the U.S. Access Board’s Medical Diagnostic Equipment Accessibility Standards Advisory Committee, which provided advice on making medical diagnostic equipment accessible to people with disabilities. The HHS cited Dr. Iezzoni’s research multiple times in proposed federal regulations issued in September 2023 (which were finalized in May 2024) to update disability nondiscrimination rules in health care under Section 504 of the 1973 Rehabilitation Act. One of the students she mentored at Harvard Medical School was Cheri Blauwet. She wrote When Walking Fails, Mobility Problems of Adults with Chronic Conditions.

== Selected publications ==
- Rosemarie Garland-Thomson & Lisa I. Iezzoni (2021) Disability Cultural Competence for All as a Model, The American Journal of Bioethics, 21:9, 26–28, doi:10.1080/15265161.2021.1958652
- Lisa I. Iezzoni, Sowmya R. Rao, Julie Ressalam, Dragana Bolcic-Jankovic, Karen Donelan, Nicole Agaronnik, Tara Lagu, Eric G. Campbell, Use of Accessible Weight Scales and Examination Tables/Chairs for Patients with Significant Mobility Limitations by Physicians Nationwide, The Joint Commission Journal on Quality and Patient Safety, Volume 47, Issue 10, 2021, Pages 615–626, ISSN 1553-7250, doi:10.1016/j.jcjq.2021.06.005
- Lisa I. Iezzoni, Opening Doors For People With Disability. Health Affairs 2021 40:4, 677–678. doi:10.1377/hlthaff.2021.00050
- Iezzoni, L. I., & O'Day, B. (2006). More than ramps: A guide to improving health care quality and access for people with disabilities. Oxford University Press. ISBN 978-0-19-517276-8
- Iezzoni, L. I. (2013). Risk adjustment for measuring health care outcomes. Health Administration Press. ISBN 978-1-56793-437-3
- Souza, A., Kelleher, A., Cooper, R., Cooper, R. A., Iezzoni, L. I., & Collins, D. M. (2010). Multiple sclerosis and mobility-related assistive technology: Systematic Review of Literature. The Journal of Rehabilitation Research and Development, 47(3), 213. doi:10.1682/jrrd.2009.07.0096

== Honors and awards ==
In 1996, Iezzoni launched her disability research with an Investigator Award in Health Policy Research from the Robert Wood Johnson Foundation and in 2024 received the Robert Wood Johnson Foundation David E. Rogers Award. She has served on the National Quality Forum's board of directors, and has received the American College of Medical Quality's Founder's Award for Outstanding Contributions to the Field. She was also included in a National Institutes of Health exhibit on American women physicians who are "changing the face of medicine".
