= Autism and LGBTQ people =

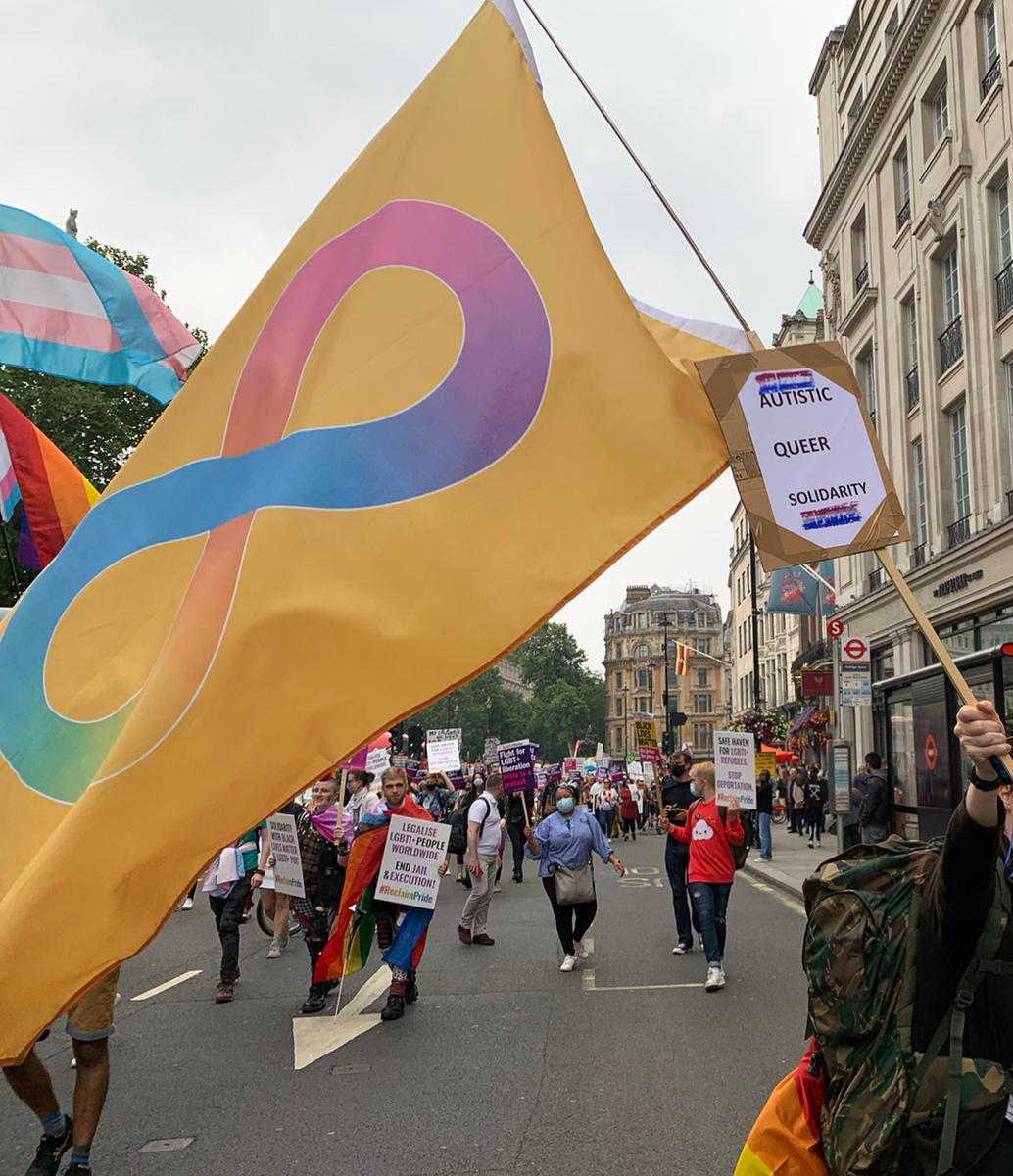
Autistic pride flag waved during Pride at a protest in 2021

Current research indicates that autistic people have higher rates of LGBTQ identities and feelings than the general population. A variety of explanations for the increased prevalence of LGBTQ identities have been proposed, such as prenatal hormonal exposure, which has been linked with sexual orientation, gender dysphoria, and autism. Alternatively, autistic people may be less reliant on social norms and thus are more open about their romantic/sexual orientation or gender identity. A narrative review published in 2016 stated that while various hypotheses have been proposed for an association between autism and gender dysphoria, they lack strong evidence. In a special issue of Autism in Adulthood, editors note that research support for autistic sexual minority studies is lacking.

== Autism and sexual orientation ==
=== General interest in sexuality ===
Early claims that autistic people lack a sex drive or desire for sexuality have been regarded as an inaccurate stereotype. These claims were a result of methodological problems. More recent evidence indicates that most autistic people express an interest in both romance and sexuality.

=== Sexual orientation of autistic people ===
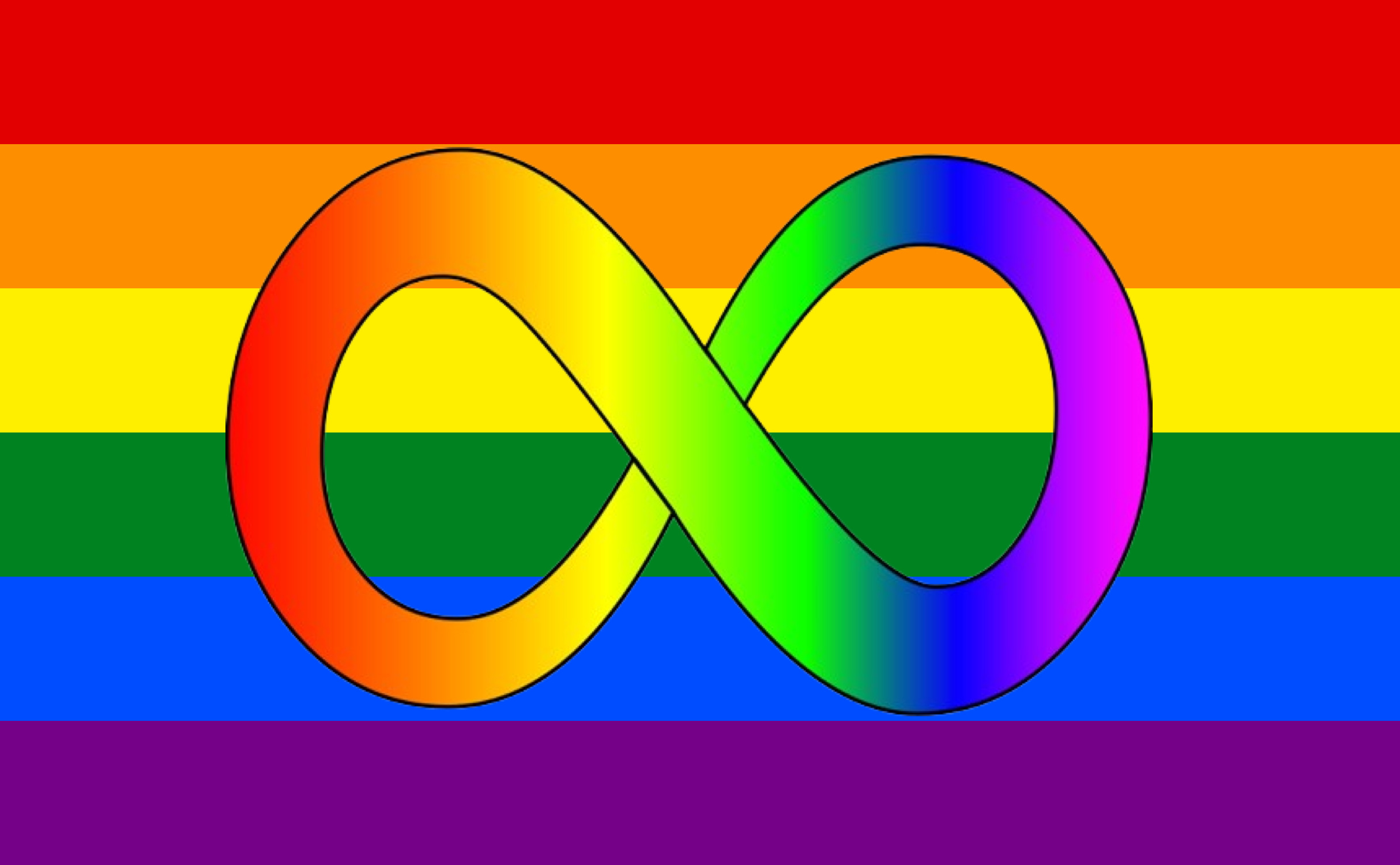
A gay pride flag design with a neurodivergent infinity symbol inset.

Autistic people are less likely to identify as heterosexual than their non-autistic counterparts. Some researchers attempt to explain this as part of an association between autism, prenatal hormones, and sexual orientation. That is not the only proposed explanation, however. While there is a broad consensus that autistic people are more likely to have an LGBTQ identity, there is great variation in estimates of the size of these effects, and most research suggests that the majority of autistic people are heterosexual. Studies on sexual orientation and autism suggest that more autistic people have homosexual and bisexual feelings compared to the general population. Studies have indicated a higher incidence of asexuality among autistic people, though a 2019 review article stated that this "should be interpreted with caution, bearing in mind the difficulty of establishing social relations in persons with [autism spectrum disorder]". Similarly, a survey of asexual individuals found that about 7% to 8% of respondents had acquired an autism diagnosis, approximately 4 times larger than the American population estimate.

The decreased incidence of heterosexuality in the autistic population is present when measuring for self-reported sexual orientations, behaviors, and interests alike.

=== Gender differences in sexual orientation ===
Some studies have indicated that autistic women have lower rates of heterosexual orientation than autistic men do. This was also corroborated by an online survey conducted by the University of Cambridge and published in Autism Research. The survey suggested that autistic women had a wider range of sexual identification than both non-autistic women and autistic men. Younger respondents had a higher likelihood of reporting themselves as homosexual than did older respondents. According to a 2021 review, some studies indicated that autistic women were about three to four times as likely to be bisexual when compared to non-autistic women.

== Autism and gender identity ==
=== Gender identity of autistic people ===
Autistic people are more likely to exhibit diverse gender identities or gender variance (also known as gender non-conformity) than the general population. The size of the difference varies significantly based on the methodology of studies and so cannot be said conclusively.

In 2016, researchers published a study that examined gender variance in a sample of 492 autistic children and adolescents at New York University's Child Study Center between 2011 and 2015. They analyzed the parents' responses to the Child Behavior Checklist (CBCL) that was administered as part of the initial evaluation of all children at the center. The study, which was reported on in the popular press, concluded that autistic children were seven times more likely to exhibit gender variance than their non-autistic peers.

A study on the gender identity of autistic people (mostly adults) without intellectual disability published in 2018 found that this group, and especially those assigned female at birth, had lower identification with their assigned gender, and lower self-esteem about that gender, than non-autistic controls. In discussing the limitations of their study, the researchers noted that they observed an unusually high occurrence of gender and sexual orientation diversity as well as mental health problems across all participants, which they attribute to a selection bias. A comparable study published in 2020 focused on autistic people (mostly adults) assigned female at birth concluded that these were more likely to identify as transgender compared to a non-autistic control group. Similar to the 2018 study, the researchers cautioned that their recruitment methods likely led to a selection bias, as they observed an unusually high occurrence of non-heterosexual orientations among the non-autistic participants. Further, the number of transgender people in the sample was relatively small.

=== Autigender ===
Some people feel that autism causes them to have a very different understanding of their gender than is expected of them. Some autistic individuals use the term "autigender" to describe the unique experience they have with their sense of gender. Autigender is often incorrectly interpreted as saying that "autism" is one's gender.

The use of "autigender" has been controversial in both the autistic and non-binary communities.

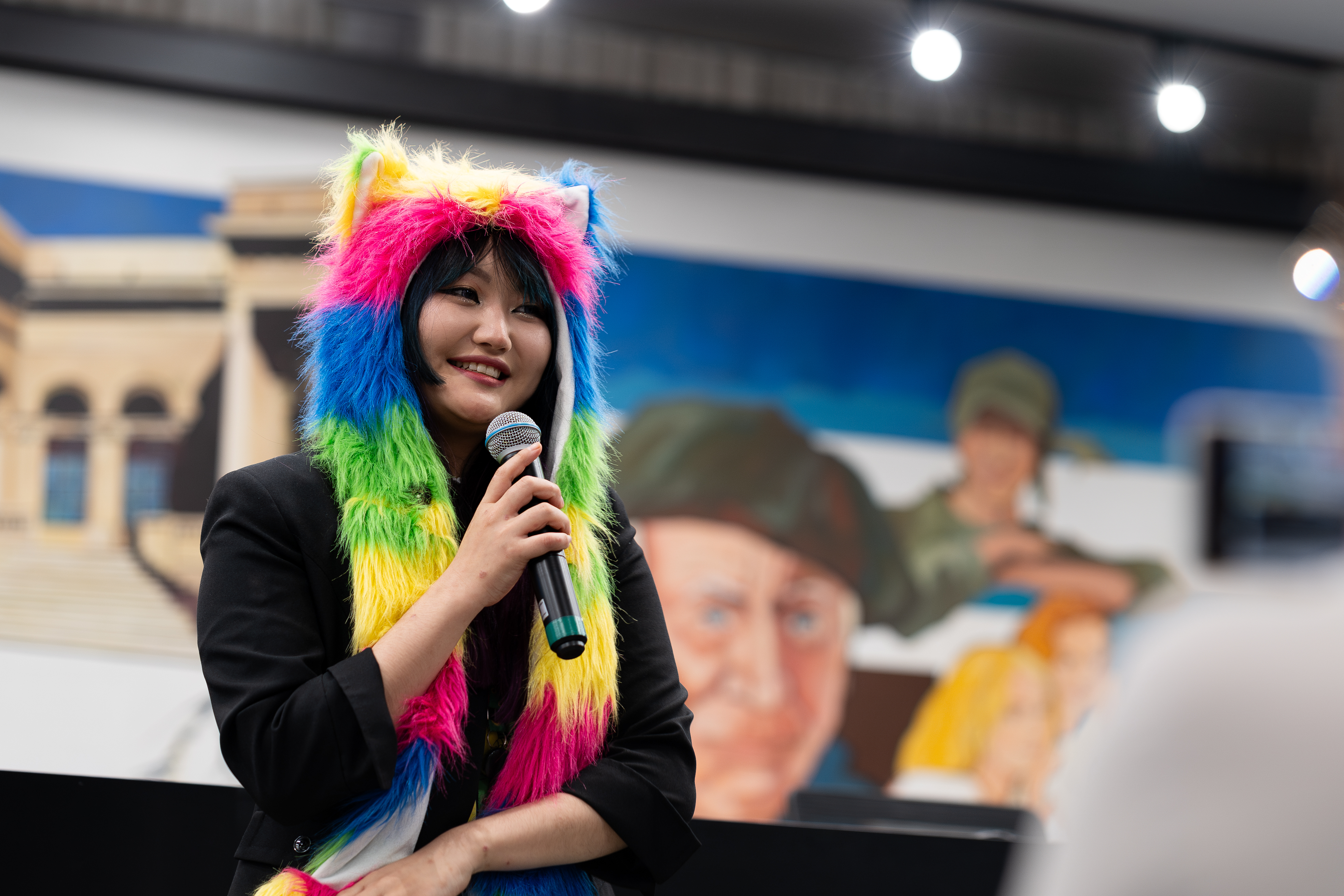
Serafim Koga is autigender

A 2025 study of Federal University of Paraná on autigender experiences reported a common trait, among some autistic, transgender, and non-binary people, is gender envy, related to mimicking or fantasizing about someone else's gender, especially self-personifying oneself as a fictional character, for example.

=== Gender dysphoria in autistic children ===
Gender dysphoria is a diagnosis in the fifth edition of the Diagnostic and Statistical Manual of Mental Disorders (DSM-5, since 2013, revised 2022) given to people who experience discomfort related to their gender identity. The 11th edition of the International Classification of Diseases (ICD-11, since 2022), maintained by the World Health Organization, describes a similar condition under the term gender incongruence.

Among people diagnosed with gender dysphoria, autistic traits are observed more often than in the general population. A 2022 meta-analysis concluded that there is a high prevalence of gender dysphoria in autistic people. The authors conclude that the data suggests a link between autism and gender dysphoria, but the nature and scope of the link require further investigation.

According to the DSM-5-TR, gender dysphoria can be difficult to diagnose in autistic people, as these might think concretely and rigidly around gender roles and/or have difficulties understanding their social context. In 2018, a first proposal for clinical guidelines for co-occurring gender dysphoria and autism was published by a team of psychiatrists from across the US.

While numerous case studies of gender dysphoria in autistic people were reported in the scientific literature, the first study to assess the convergence of gender dysphoria and autism was not published until 2010, when researchers in the Netherlands examined 129 children and adolescents who were diagnosed with gender identity disorder (the precursor to gender dysphoria defined in the DSM-IV) at a gender identity clinic, finding that 6 individuals (4.7%) were also diagnosed as autistic. A 2016 review of the available literature concluded that the prevalence of autism among children and adolescents diagnosed with gender dysphoria was higher than in the general population. A narrative review published in 2016 concluded that hypotheses regarding the underlying causes lacked evidence.

=== Autistic traits in gender non-conforming and transgender people ===
A 2022 meta-analysis concluded that there is a relationship between autistic traits and feelings of gender dysphoria. However, the researchers noted that little is known about autistic traits in those who are non-autistic.

Some studies have noted an overlap between those who are autistic and those who are transgender. British researchers in 2011 concluded that trans men had more autistic traits than trans women. However, a study by British researchers in 2013 concluded that there was "no significant difference" between trans men and trans women in autistic traits observed. Steven Stagg and Jaime Vincent of Anglia Ruskin University concluded in September 2019 that some of those seeking advice and help for their gender identity may be autistic, whether diagnosed or not, with these abilities impeding possible support, and urged clinicians treating individuals who are transgender or non-binary, especially those assigned female at birth, to consider whether they have undiagnosed autism spectrum disorder. Four researchers in January 2020 suggested "overlap between autism and transgender identity", possibly more in trans men than trans women, and stated that anxiety and depression were the highest in autistic individuals who were transgender. Scientists with the Autism Research Centre at University of Cambridge, using data from 600,000 adults in the UK, concluded in August 2020 that adults who were transgender or gender diverse were three to six times more likely to have an autistic diagnosis than those who were cisgender, and suggested that between 3.5 and 6.5% of transgender and gender diverse adults in the UK are autistic.

Other researchers have noted the prevalence of autistic traits among those who identify as non-binary or genderqueer. Two Warwick University researchers, utilizing data from 446 UK adult respondents, concluded in January 2016 that, based on their sample, genderqueer individuals were more likely to be autistic than any other group with gender dysphoria.

=== Gender-affirming care for autistic people ===
In December 2014, four researchers concluded that being autistic does not "preclude gender transition" and suggested methods for assisting such individuals in "exploring their gender identities". One of the study's authors, Katherine Rachlin, said that, sometimes, being transgender can "look like the spectrum experience" to clinicians. In March 2015, a study from researchers at the Yale School of Medicine stated that autistic people should be treated equally to other individuals for gender dysphoria, and suggested that clinicians "broaden the social frame" and facilitate an "exploration of gender roles". A Finnish study in April 2015 recommended that the autism spectrum be recognized seriously in developing guidelines for treating "child and adolescent gender dysphoria".

A 2022 survey of gender clinic healthcare clinicians found there were often differences in communication and thinking styles between the clinicians and autistic patients. The study concluded that adaptations should be made, including training for clinicians on working with autistic patients, and adjustments made in the clinical setting.

WPATH SOC Version 8, published in August 2022, states that there is no evidence that withholding gender-affirming care from individuals with neurodevelopmental conditions has any benefit. WPATH SOC 8 further recommends that healthcare professionals working with gender-diverse adolescents receive training and develop expertise in autism spectrum disorder and other neurodevelopmental presentations.

=== Mental health of gender diverse autistic people ===
In a 2021 study on autistic camouflaging, gender-diverse autistic adults were found to use more autistic camouflaging than cisgender autistic adults.

A January 2023 study on trans and non-binary adults found that a higher incidence of autistic traits and higher gender minority stress were correlated with poorer mental health outcomes.

== In popular culture ==
Autistic characters that are part of the LGBTQ community are occasionally depicted in popular culture, whether in literature, animated, or live-action series. Some have called for better representation. For instance, in June 2015, author Heidi Cullinan wrote in Spectrum that there are not nearly enough works of fiction with autistic people and even fewer who are part of the LGBTQ community, inspiring them to write a story with a gay autistic protagonist. They also said that autistic people deserve to see themselves in stories, like anyone else. In March 2021, queer autistic novelist Naoise Dolan echoed this in an interview with PinkNews, calling for more visibility, saying that popular culture and art would be improved if "there were more queer autistics out there", along with other marginalized groups. She also criticized bad portrayals of autistic characters and expressed her desire to "deliberately write the most counter-stereotypical autistic character possible".

Occasionally, LGBTQ autistic characters appear in literature. A 2015 novel, Carry the Ocean, by Heidi Cullinan, gay protagonist, Jeremey Samon, develops a romantic relationship with an autistic boy named Emmet Washington. Ada Hoffman's 2019 debut novel, The Outside, has a lesbian and autistic protagonist, Yasira Shien, who once had a lover named Tiv. The book's sequel, The Fallen, came out in July 2021, with a reappearance of Yasira, and the book was praised for its "excellent neurodiverse representation". Zack Smedley's 2019 novel, Tonight We Rule the World, tells the story of Owen, a "bisexual high schooler...on the autism spectrum".

Some creators and characters of animated series are autistic and part of the LGBTQ community. The creator of Dead End: Paranormal Park, Hamish Steele, an autistic gay man, has said that he incorporated his experiences into characters such as Norma Khan in the show of the same name, who is bisexual and autistic.

Live-action television series have LGBTQ autistic characters as well. In March 2020, it was announced that the series Everything's Gonna Be Okay was introducing a "queer storyline" for autistic protagonist Matilda, who explores her sexual identity as a pansexual woman, and her friend, Drea, becomes her girlfriend. The show's creator, Josh Thomas, told The Advocate that he likes "having queer people in my show", noted that autistic people have "an extreme emotional vulnerability", and said that it is "exciting that people on the spectrum are boldly leading and as far as identity goes". In the course of filming the first season, he realised that he is autistic himself and obtained a formal diagnosis. In the second season, his character (a gay man) comes to realise he, too, is autistic. The rebooted Australian series Heartbreak High also features a lesbian autistic character, Quinni, played by autistic actor Chloé Hayden and written with her input.

== See also ==
- Neurodivergence and LGBTQ people
- Neuroqueer theory
