= Zebra stripes (disambiguation) =

Zebra stripes describe the patterns on a zebra's coat.

Zebra stripes or zebra striping may also refer to:

== Computing ==
- Zebra striping, the coloring of every other row of a table to improve readability
- Zebra patterning, or zebra stripes, a feature on some video cameras to aid in correct exposure
- Zebra analysis, or zebra striping, a diagnostic shading technique used in computer graphics

== Other uses ==
- Zebra stripes, a characteristic of some immersion burns
- Zebra stripes, one of the possible primitive markings of horses and other equids
- Zebra print, an animal print that resembles the pattern of the skin and fur of a zebra
- Zebra crossing, a type of pedestrian crossing involving black-and-white stripes
- Zebra strip, an elastomeric connector with an alternating black-and-white stripe pattern

== See also ==
- Stripe (disambiguation)
- Zebra (disambiguation)
- The Zebra-Striped Hearse, a 1962 mystery novel by Ross McDonald
