= Eka Esu Williams =

Nigerian immunologist and activist

- Born: Ekanem Esu Williams; 1950 (age 75–76); Northern Nigeria
- Education: University of Nigeria; University of the Witwatersrand; University of London
- Occupations: Immunologist and activist

Ekanem Esu Williams (born 1950) is a Nigerian-born immunologist and a reproductive health and rights activist.

== Life and work ==
Born in northern Nigeria, Williams was the third of eight children. She received her first degree from the University of Nigeria in 1975, then graduated from University of the Witwatersrand, South Africa. In 1984, she earned a doctorate in immunology from the University of London. In 1985, she returned to Nigeria to take a post at the University of Calabar; two years later, she was passed over for promotion, because it was felt that she already had more than a woman could expect.

She is a founding member of the Society for Women and AIDS Against Africa in 1998, and she is also a trustee of The Listen Charity South Africa.

She served as a research associate at the Population Council in Washington, DC, and Johannesburg, from 1998 to 2007.

Williams became a program officer with the Ford Foundation in 2007 working from the foundation's Southern Africa office in Johannesburg. There, she has concentrated on the work of HIV/AIDS and reproductive health and rights issues in several sub-Saharan African countries.

== Selected works ==
- Esu-Williams, E., Mulanga-Kabeya, C., Takena, H., Zwandor, A., Aminu, K., Adamu, I., ... & Delaporte, E. (1997). "Seroprevalence of HIV-1, HIV-2, and HIV-1 group O in Nigeria: evidence for a growing increase of HIV infection". Journal of Acquired Immune Deficiency Syndromes, 16(3), 204–210.
- Jubier-Maurin, V., Saragosti, S., Perret, J. L., Mpoudi, E., Esu-Williams, E., Mulanga, C., ... & Peeters, M. (1999). "Genetic characterization of the nef gene from human immunodeficiency virus type 1 group M strains representing genetic subtypes A, B, C, E, F, G, and H". AIDS Research and Human Retroviruses, 15(1), 23–32.
- Esu-Williams, E. (2000). "Gender and HIV/AIDS in Africa− Our Hope Lies in the Future". Journal of Health Communication, 5(sup1), 123–126.
- Peeters, M., Esu-Williams, E., Vergne, L., Montavon, C., Mulanga-Kabeya, C., Harry, T., ... & Delaporte, E. (2000). "Predominance of subtype A and G HIV type 1 in Nigeria, with geographical differences in their distribution". AIDS Research and Human Retroviruses, 16(4), 315–325.
- Geibel, S., Luchters, S., King'Ola, N., Esu-Williams, E., Rinyiru, A., & Tun, W. (2008). "Factors associated with self-reported unprotected anal sex among male sex workers in Mombasa, Kenya". Sexually transmitted diseases, 746–752.
