= Harold S. Koplewicz =

American psychiatrist

Harold Koplewicz
- Born: Harold Samuel Koplewicz; January 12, 1953 (age 73); Crown Heights, Brooklyn
- Occupation: Child psychiatrist

Harold Samuel Koplewicz (/ˈkɒpləwɪts/ KOP-lə-wits; born January 12, 1953) is a nationally known child and adolescent psychiatrist. He is the founder and president of the nonprofit Child Mind Institute and editor-in-chief of the Journal of Child and Adolescent Psychopharmacology.

== Early life and education ==
Harold Koplewicz was born in Crown Heights, Brooklyn. Koplewicz partly credits his father, a Holocaust survivor, for inspiring his interest in medicine, saying "he was very clear that what you carry in your head means everything." His interest in medicine was also sparked by the relationships he had with doctors treating his idiopathic thrombocytopenic purpura.

Koplewicz earned a bachelor's degree in psychology from the University of Maryland. He initially went to medical school for pediatrics, but eventually transferred to a general psychiatric residency, earning his Doctor of Medicine degree from Albert Einstein College of Medicine.

== Professional career ==
According to The New York Times in 1996, Koplewicz was:

Chief of child and adolescent psychiatry at Schneider Children's Hospital and Hillside Hospital at the Long Island Jewish Medical Center. After graduating from the Albert Einstein College of Medicine, Dr. Koplewicz completed a pediatric internship at the Bronx Municipal Hospital Center. He studied general psychiatry at Cornell University and completed a two-year research fellowship through the National Institute of Mental Health.

In 1997 he helped found and served as the first director of the NYU Child Study Center (CSC), a position he held until he left NYU in October 2009. He received a severance package in excess of $1.2 million. Koplewicz served as the chairman of the board of a medical devices company called Delcath from 2007 to 2011. While Koplewicz worked at NYU Langone, he also served as the director of the Nathan S. Kline Institute for Psychiatric Research, a psychiatric facility run by the state of New York. In 2011 Koplewicz was dismissed from this role following a dispute with Jeffrey A. Sachs, the newly installed advisor on health care issues to the Governor.

In 2007, an advertising campaign for the Child Study Center raised objections over its use of simulated ransom notes, seemingly addressed to parents of autistic children. The campaign was abandoned.

After leaving NYU in 2009 Koplewicz started the Child Mind Institute. Two CSC board members left with Koplewicz to serve as co-chairs of his new board of directors. Koplewicz serves as the medical director of the clinic, president of the foundation, and practices on a limited basis.

== Paxil Study 329 controversy ==
In 2001 Koplewicz was one of 22 co-authors of a study referred to as study 329, a drug trial sponsored by GlaxoSmithKline (GSK), that looked at the safety of the use of psychotropic antidepressant drug Paxil (Paroxetine) and concluded that Paxil "is generally well-tolerated and effective for major depression in adolescents" (p. 762). The report and conclusions were then used by GSK to market the drug to children. In October 2011 the company was sued by the United States Department of Justice (DOJ) for false claims and for a fraudulent scheme to deceive and defraud, and charged that the company touted the study 329 and journal article "that it paid to have drafted and that exaggerated Paxil's efficacy while downplaying risks identified in one of the trials." In the summer of 2012 GSK settled the lawsuit with the DOJ for a record $3 billion (and more recently the State of North Carolina for $32 million).

== Television ==
- Sally - I'm Frantic About My Teen - Guest Psychiatrist - Gave advice to moms about their troubled teens

== Publications and awards ==
Koplewicz has edited or authored more than 65 peer-reviewed articles and chapters on child and adolescent psychiatry. He is also the editor, author or contributor to several books, including the textbook Depression in Children and Adolescents (Hardwood, 1993); It's Nobody's Fault: New Hope and Help for Difficult Children and Their Parents; Childhood Revealed: Art Expressing Pain, Discovery & Hope; Turbulent Times, Prophetic Dreams: Art of Palestinian and Israeli Children (2000); More Than Moody: Recognizing and Treating Adolescent Depression; and The Day Our World Changed: Children's Art of 9/11.

He has received a number of industry awards, including the 1997 Exemplary Psychiatrist Award from the National Alliance for the Mentally Ill, the 1998 Reiger Service Award from the American Academy of Child and Adolescent Psychiatry in recognition of his work in the development of school-based mental health programs, the 1999 Humanitarian Award from Marymount Manhattan College, the 2000 American Grand Hope Award from the Aprica Childcare Institute, the 2002 Catcher in the Rye Award from the American Academy of Child and Adolescent Psychiatry, the 2007 Irving Philips Award for Prevention, the 2009 American Psychiatric Association McAlpin Award for lifetime contributions to child psychiatry, the 2010 American Society for Adolescent Psychiatry William Schonfeld Award, and the 2020 Albert Einstein College of Medicine Dominick P. Purpura Distinguished Alumni Award.

== See also ==
- Attention deficit hyperactivity disorder controversies
- Biopsychiatry controversy
- Child and adolescent psychiatry
