= Population Health Management =

- Discipline: Public health
- Language: English
- Edited by: David B. Nash

Publication details
- Former name(s): Disease Management
- History: 1998-present
- Publisher: Mary Ann Liebert, Inc.
- Frequency: Bimonthly
- Impact factor: 2.459 (2020)

Standard abbreviations
- ISO 4: Popul. Health Manag.

Indexing
- ISSN: 1942-7891 (print); 1942-7905 (web)
- LCCN: 2008214562
- OCLC no.: 231763639

Links
- Journal homepage; Online archive

Population Health Management is a bimonthly peer-reviewed public health journal covering the study of population health, and how it can be improved by improving health care services. It was established in 1998 as Disease Management, obtaining its current name in 2008; the journal's first issue under its current name was published in August 2008. It is published by Mary Ann Liebert, Inc. and the editor-in-chief is David B. Nash (Thomas Jefferson University). According to the Journal Citation Reports, the journal has a 2020 impact factor of 2.459.
