= Genetic Testing and Molecular Biomarkers =

- Discipline: Genetics, Molecular Biology
- Language: English
- Edited by: Garth Ehrlich

Publication details
- History: 2009–present
- Publisher: Mary Ann Liebert, Inc.
- Frequency: monthly
- Impact factor: 1.21 (2018)

Standard abbreviations
- ISO 4: Genet. Test. Mol. Biomark.
- NLM: Genet Test Mol Biomarkers

Indexing
- ISSN: 1945-0265 (print); 1945-0257 (web)
- LCCN: 2008212853
- OCLC no.: 244486920

Links
- Journal homepage; Online access

Genetic Testing and Molecular Biomarkers is a monthly peer reviewed scientific journal published by Mary Ann Liebert, Inc. The editor-in-chief is Garth Ehrlichs. The journal covers genetic testing research along with associated ethical, legal, social, and economic issues. Related genetic testing coverage includes risk assessment, genetic counseling, carrier detection, novel instrumentation, and cytogenetics. It is the official journal of Genetic Alliance.

== Abstracting and indexing ==
This journal is indexed and abstracted by the following services:

- PubMed/MEDLINE
- Current Contents/Life Sciences
- Current Contents/Clinical Medicine
- Science Citation Index
- Biotechnology Citation Index
- Biological Abstracts
- BIOSIS Previews
- EMBASE/Excerpta Medica
- EMBiology
- Scopus
- CAB Abstracts
- Global Health
