= Zebra Man =

Zebra Man may refer to:

- Zebraman, a 2004 film by Takashi Miike
- Zebraman 2: Attack on Zebra City, a 2010 sequel film
- Zebra-Man, the name of several villains in DC Comics
- The Zebra Man, stage name of sideshow performer Horace Ridler (1892–1969)

== See also ==
- Zebra (disambiguation)
