= Journal of Medicinal Food =

- Discipline: Clinical nutrition
- Language: English
- Edited by: Sampath Parthasarathy; Jeongmin Lee

Publication details
- History: 1998–present
- Publisher: Mary Ann Liebert, Inc.
- Frequency: Monthly
- Impact factor: 1.955 (2016)

Standard abbreviations
- ISO 4: J. Med. Food

Indexing
- CODEN: JMFOFJ
- ISSN: 1096-620X (print); 1557-7600 (web)
- LCCN: 98657820
- OCLC no.: 901021514

Links
- Journal homepage; Online access; Online archive

The Journal of Medicinal Food is a monthly peer-reviewed medical journal covering the health effects of foods and their components. It was established in 1998 and is published by Mary Ann Liebert, Inc. The editors-in-chief are Michael Zemel, PhD, (Professor Emeritus, The University of Tennessee, Chief Scientific Officer, NuSirt Biopharma) and Jeongmin Lee, PhD, (Kyung Hee University). According to the Journal Citation Reports, the journal has a 2020 impact factor of 2.786.
