= Sampath Parthasarathy =

US academic

Sampath Parthasarathy is a former Associate Dean of Research and current Professor and Florida Hospital Chair in Cardiovascular Science in the College of Medicine at the University of Central Florida. He is the editor-in-chief of Healthcare and co-editor-in-chief of the Journal of Medicinal Food.
