= Zebrafish (disambiguation) =

Zebrafish (Danio rerio) is a small freshwater fish commonly used as a model organism.

Zebrafish may also refer to:

- Zebrafish (journal), an academic journal focusing on research using Danio rerio and related species
  - Zebrafish Information Network, a biological database of information on Danio rerio
- Logperch (some species of Percina), a group of North American freshwater fish also known as zebrafish
- Pterois, a genus of venomous lionfish, also known as zebrafish
  - Red lionfish (Pterois volitans), an Australian coral reef fish also known as a zebrafish
- Girella zebra, Australian fish also known as zebrafish
- Zebra Fish (sculpture), a 1989 sculpture by Wayne Chabre

== See also ==
- Maylandia, a genus of cichlids
