= The CRISPR Journal =

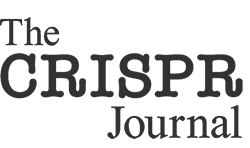
- Discipline: Molecular genetics
- Language: English
- Edited by: Rodolphe Barrangou

Publication details
- History: 2018–present
- Publisher: Mary Ann Liebert
- Frequency: Bimonthly
- Impact factor: 4 (2024)

Standard abbreviations
- ISO 4: CRISPR J.

Indexing
- ISSN: 2573-1599 (print); 2573-1602 (web)

Links
- Journal homepage

The CRISPR Journal is a bimonthly, peer-reviewed scientific journal published by Mary Ann Liebert. It covers research on all aspects of CRISPR research, including its uses in synthetic biology and genome editing. The editor-in-chief is Rodolphe Barrangou. The journal was established in 2018.

== See also ==
- Genome editing
