= Journal of Child and Adolescent Psychopharmacology =

- Discipline: Child and adolescent psychiatry Psychopharmacology
- Language: English
- Edited by: Harold S. Koplewicz

Publication details
- History: 1990–present
- Publisher: Mary Ann Liebert, Inc.
- Frequency: 10/year
- Impact factor: 2.901 (2017)

Standard abbreviations
- ISO 4: J. Child Adolesc. Psychopharmacol.

Indexing
- CODEN: JADPET
- ISSN: 1044-5463 (print); 1557-8992 (web)
- OCLC no.: 1070645135

Links
- Journal homepage; Online access; Online archive

The Journal of Child and Adolescent Psychopharmacology is a peer-reviewed medical journal covering psychopharmacology in children and adolescents. It was established in 1990 and is published ten times per year by Mary Ann Liebert. The editor-in-chief is Harold S. Koplewicz (Child Mind Institute). According to the Journal Citation Reports, the journal has a 2017 impact factor of 2.901.
