= Surgical Infections =

Peer-reviewed bi-monthly medical journal

- Discipline: Surgery
- Language: English
- Edited by: Donald E. Fry

Publication details
- History: April 2000 – present
- Publisher: Mary Ann Liebert, Inc.
- Frequency: Bi-Monthly
- Impact factor: 1.448 (2014)

Standard abbreviations
- ISO 4: Surg. Infect.

Indexing
- ISSN: 1096-2964 (print); 1557-8674 (web)

Links
- Journal homepage; Online access

Surgical Infections is a peer-reviewed medical journal published by Mary Ann Liebert, Inc. It is the official journal of the Surgical Infection Society, the Surgical Infection Society Europe, the Surgical Infection Society Latin America, and the Chinese Society of Surgical Infection and Intensive Care.

Surgical Infections "provides information on the biology, prevention, and management of post-operative infections." The journal has a 2014 impact factor of 1.448.

The editor-in-chief is Donald E. Fry (Northwestern University Feinberg School of Medicine).
