= Percutaneous hepatic perfusion =

- Specialty: Oncology

Percutaneous hepatic perfusion (PHP) is a regionalized, minimally-invasive approach to cancer treatment currently undergoing Phase II and Phase III clinical testing. PHP treats a variety of hepatic tumors by isolating the liver and exposing the organ to high-dose chemotherapy. As demonstrated in clinical trials, patients treated by PHP can tolerate much higher doses of chemotherapeutic agents than those receiving traditional systemic chemotherapy without increased toxicities.

== Procedure ==
Using a system of catheters and filters, PHP isolates the liver from the circulatory system and infuses a chemotherapeutic agent directly to the liver via the hepatic artery. The venous effluent from the liver is then filtered outside of the body and the filtered blood is returned into the jugular vein. PHP is a repeatable procedure and can be performed in an operating room or a radiology suite under local or general anesthesia.

== See also ==
- Delcath Systems
