= Neurodivergence and LGBTQ people =

Current research indicates that neurodivergent people have higher rates of LGBTQ identities and feelings than the general population. However, statistical data on both queer and neurodivergent people is limited by differing social and cultural definitions of identity, safety concerns of coming out, the ability to receive a diagnosis, and other factors.

== Baseline statistics ==
The latest data compiled from around the world estimates about 10-20% of the general population are neurodivergent in some way. Among the general global population, about 1-2% have been diagnosed with autism, 1.13% have been diagnosed with ADHD, and 5-17% have been diagnosed with dyslexia, though global data lacks the nuance of individual countries, the criteria, and timing of assessments. A 2023 survey of adults in 30 countries suggests about 9% of the general population identifies as LGBTQ; however, this data leaves out many other countries and is limited by who participated and how comfortable they felt answering the survey freely. Similar studies compiling worldwide data have estimated about 0.4-1.3% of the general population identifies as gender diverse. There is variation in population statistics between countries. For example, 2021 census data from the United Kingdom reports that only 3% of the general population identify as gay, lesbian, or bisexual, where the global estimate is about 9% of the general population.

== Statistical relationship between neurodivergence and queerness ==
Recent research suggests neurodivergent people, especially autistic individuals, are more likely than their neurotypical peers to identify as LGBTQIA+. More specifically, autistic individuals are 3 times as likely to identify as transgender compared to their neurotypical peers; a higher incidence of autistic traits has been associated with a higher rate of identifying as gender diverse. Further research expands on this, finding that of their participants, 0.7% of non-autistic children identify as gender diverse, while 4–5.4% of autistic children do identify as gender diverse. Additionally, a study on sexuality and neurodivergence found that while 70% of neurotypical participants identified as heterosexual, only 30% of autistic people identified as heterosexual. Other research on neurodivergence and sexuality has suggested neurodivergent people 8 times as likely to identify as asexual than their neurotypical peers.

The relationship between neurodivergence and queerness appears to go both ways, with neurodivergent people more likely to identify as LGBTQIA+, and gender diverse people more likely to be neurodivergent compared to their cisgender peers. Individuals who do not identify with their sex assigned at birth are between 3 and 6 times more likely to be autistic compared to their cisgender peers. Compared to their cisgender peers, gender-diverse individuals are more likely to report traits of autism—enhanced pattern recognition, sensory issues and difficulty understanding other emotions—and 5 times more likely to suspect they are undiagnosed autistics. Research on transgender adolescents suggests about 6-25.5% of people who identify as gender diverse are also autistic. One study in the Netherlands suggested 5% of the general population identified as gender diverse, compared to 15% percent of autistic adults, highlighting the relationship between gender diversity and autism. A study in the U.S. showed a similar result, where 3-5% of the general population wanted to be the opposite gender compared to 11.4% of autistic adults.

== See also ==
- Autism and LGBTQ people
- Neuroqueer theory
