= Journal of Neurotrauma =

- Discipline: Neurology
- Language: English
- Edited by: David L. Brody

Publication details
- History: 1984–present
- Publisher: Mary Ann Liebert, Inc. (United States)
- Frequency: Monthly
- Impact factor: 5.269 (2020)

Standard abbreviations
- ISO 4: J. Neurotrauma

Indexing
- ISSN: 0897-7151 (print); 1557-9042 (web)
- OCLC no.: 488614956

Links
- Journal homepage; Online access

The Journal of Neurotrauma is a monthly peer-reviewed medical journal covering research on neurotraumas. It is an official journal of the National Neurotrauma Society and the International Neurotrauma Society. The journal was established in 1984 and is published by Mary Ann Liebert, Inc. The editor-in-chief is David L. Brody.

Journal of Neurotrauma reports the latest advances in both the clinical and laboratory investigation of traumatic brain and spinal cord injury. The Journal focuses on the basic pathobiology of injury to the central nervous system, while considering preclinical and clinical trials targeted at improving both the early management and long-term care and recovery of traumatically injured patients.

Journal of Neurotrauma coverage includes:

- Neuronal injury from a cellular to molecular perspective
- Neurochemical alterations and behavioral abnormalities
- Electrophysiological change
- Stem cell biology and transplantation
- Neurorehabilitation

== Abstracting and indexing ==
The journal is abstracted and indexed in:

- Biological Abstracts
- BIOSIS Previews
- Current Contents/Life Sciences
- EBSCO databases
- Embase
- Index Medicus/MEDLINE/PubMed
- ProQuest databases
- PsycINFO
- Science Citation Index
- Scopus

According to the Journal Citation Reports, the journal has a 2020 impact factor of 5.269.
