= Cyberpsychology, Behavior, and Social Networking =

- Discipline: Cyberpsychology; Human-computer interaction Social psychology
- Language: English
- Edited by: Brenda K. Wiederhold

Publication details
- Former name(s): CyberPsychology & Behavior
- History: 1998–present
- Publisher: Mary Ann Liebert, Inc. (United States)
- Frequency: Monthly
- Impact factor: 4.157 (2020)

Standard abbreviations
- ISO 4: Cyberpsychol. Behav. Soc. Netw.

Indexing
- ISSN: 2152-2715 (print); 2152-2723 (web)
- LCCN: 2009208160
- OCLC no.: 900961229

Links
- Journal homepage; Online access; Online archive

Cyberpsychology, Behavior, and Social Networking is a monthly peer-reviewed scientific journal covering cyberpsychology and the psychological effects of social networking services like Facebook and Twitter. It was established in 1998 as CyberPsychology & Behavior, obtaining its current name in 2010. It is published by Mary Ann Liebert, Inc. and the editor-in-chief is Brenda K. Wiederhold (Scripps Memorial Hospital). According to the Journal Citation Reports, the journal has a 2020 impact factor of 4.157.
