= Statue of Florence R. Sabin =

Statue in the U.S. Capitol by Joy Buba

Florence R. Sabin
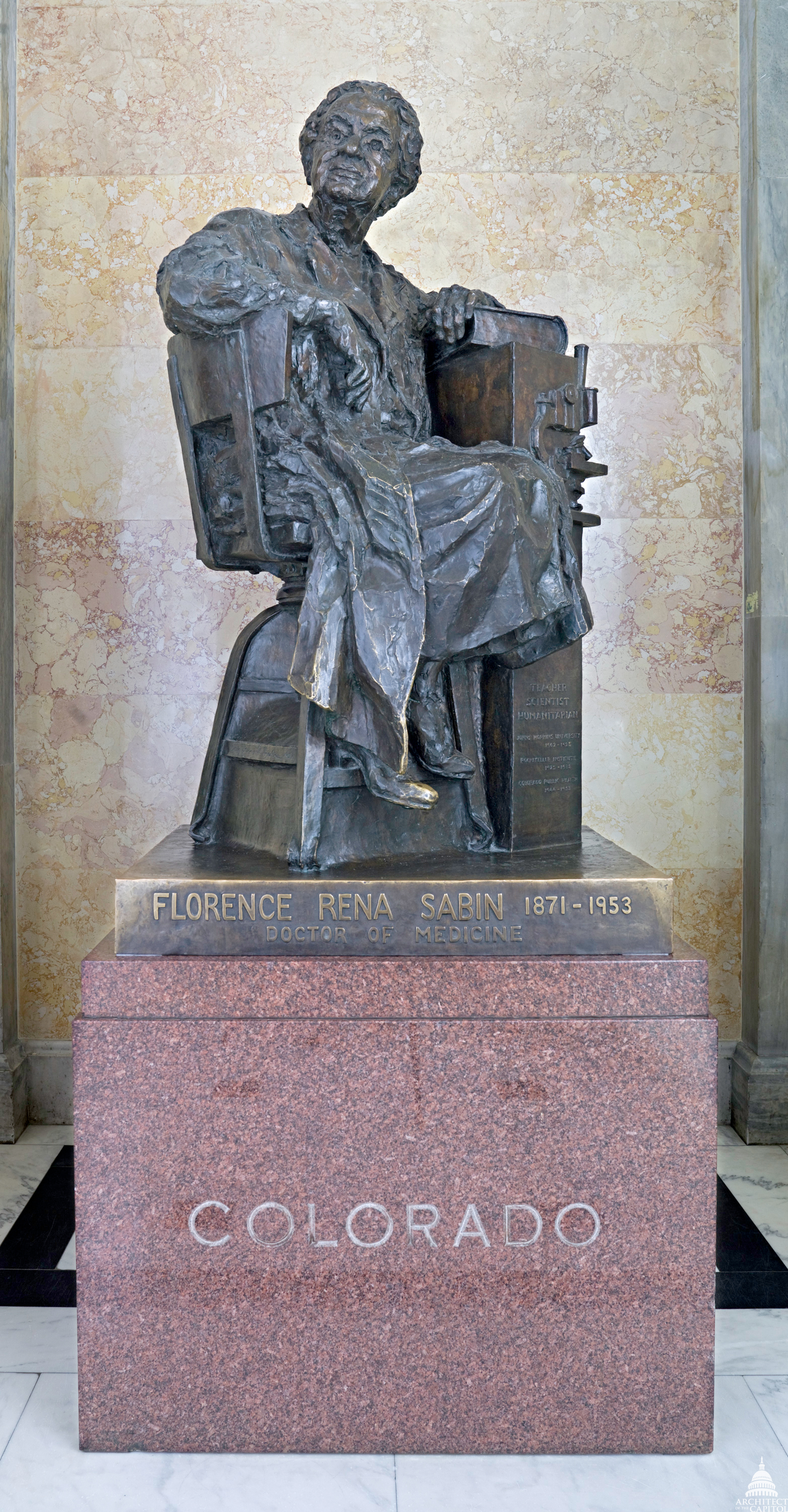
- The statue in 2011
- Artist: Joy Buba
- Medium: Bronze sculpture
- Subject: Florence R. Sabin
- Location: Washington, D.C., U.S.

Florence R. Sabin is a bronze sculpture depicting the American medical scientist of the same name by Joy Buba, installed in the Hall of Columns, in Washington, D.C., as part of the National Statuary Hall Collection. The statue was gifted by the U.S. state of Colorado in 1959.

== See also ==
- 1959 in art
