= Journal of Adolescent and Young Adult Oncology =

- Discipline: Oncology; Adolescent medicine
- Language: English
- Edited by: Leonard S. Sender

Publication details
- History: 2011-present
- Publisher: Mary Ann Liebert, Inc.
- Frequency: Bimonthly
- Impact factor: 1.431 (2016)

Standard abbreviations
- ISO 4: J. Adolesc. Young Adult Oncol.

Indexing
- ISSN: 2156-5333 (print); 2156-535X (web)
- OCLC no.: 1019994194

Links
- Journal homepage; Online access; Online archive

The Journal of Adolescent and Young Adult Oncology is a bimonthly peer-reviewed medical journal covering oncology as it relates to adolescents and young adults. It was established in April 2011 and is published by Mary Ann Liebert, Inc. on behalf of the Society for Adolescent and Young Adult Oncology, of which it is the official journal. Since the journal first launched, its editor-in-chief has been Leonard Sender (Children's Hospital of Orange County). According to the Journal Citation Reports, the journal has a 2016 impact factor of 1.431.
