= Astrobiology (journal) =

- Discipline: Astrobiology
- Language: English
- Edited by: Sherry L. Cady

Publication details
- History: 2001–present
- Publisher: Mary Ann Liebert, Inc.
- Frequency: Bimonthly
- Open access: Hybrid
- Impact factor: 2.6 (2024)

Standard abbreviations
- ISO 4: Astrobiology

Indexing
- CODEN: ASTRC4
- ISSN: 1531-1074 (print); 1557-8070 (web)
- LCCN: 00213943
- OCLC no.: 44648498

Links
- Journal homepage; Online access

Astrobiology is a peer-reviewed scientific journal covering research on the origin, evolution, distribution and future of life across the universe. The journal's scope includes astrobiology, astrophysics, astropaleontology, bioastronomy, cosmochemistry, ecogenomics, exobiology, extremophiles, geomicrobiology, gravitational biology, life detection technology, meteoritics, origins of life, planetary geoscience, planetary protection, prebiotic chemistry, space exploration technology and terraforming.

== Abstracting and indexing ==
This journal is indexed by the following services:

- Astrophysics Data System
- Biological Abstracts
- BIOSIS Previews
- Chemical Abstracts
- Compendex
- Current Contents/Agriculture, Biology & Environmental Sciences
- Current Contents/Physical, Chemical & Earth Sciences
- EMBiology
- GEOBASE
- GeoRef
- MEDLINE
- Science Citation Index
- Scopus

According to the Journal Citation Reports, the journal has a 2024 impact factor of 2.6.
