= Garth Ehrlich =

American molecular biologist

Garth David Ehrlich
- Occupations: Molecular biologist, genomic scientist, academic, and author

Academic background
- Education: BA, and PhD
- Alma mater: Alfred University; Syracuse University

Garth David Ehrlich is a molecular biologist, genomic scientist, academic, and author who is most known for his development of the distributed genome hypothesis and bringing the biofilm paradigm to the field of chronic mucosal bacterial diseases. He is a professor of Microbiology and Immunology, and Otolaryngology-Head and Neck Surgery at Drexel University. He is also the founder and executive director of three Research Centers of Excellence: the Center for Genomic Sciences (CGS); the Center for Advanced Microbial Processing (CAMP); and the Center for Surgical Infections and Biofilms. In addition, he serves as the executive director of the Genomics Core Facility and the director of Molecular Pathology within Drexel Medicine Diagnostics and the Sidney Kimmel Cancer Center's Meta-omics Core Facility.

Ehrlich has authored two books entitled, PCR-Based Diagnostics in Infectious Disease, and Culture-Negative Orthopedic Biofilm Infections. His research interests revolve around the field of molecular pathogenesis with a particular focus on chronic infectious diseases, human genetic susceptibility, and resistance to infections by employing comparative genomic technologies.

Ehrlich is an elected Fellow of the American Association for the Advancement of Science, the American Academy of Microbiology, and the Editor-in-Chief emeritus of, Genetic Testing and Molecular Biomarkers. He is also the Associate Editor of BMC Ecology and Evolution, and Genes. As of 2022, he is the chair of the scientific advisory board of Keystone Bio which is a bio-technology company developing biologicals to combat systemic inflammatory disease.

== Education ==
Ehrlich graduated with a Bachelor of Arts in biology from Alfred University in 1977. He, then enrolled at Syracuse University for a Ph.D. in molecular biology and graduated in 1987 during which time he was a member of the team that first applied PCR to the detection of low copy number infectious agents. Subsequently, he undertook a postdoctoral fellowship in human retrovirology at SUNY Upstate Medical Center where he demonstrated that HTLV-I was associated with a demyelinating disease of the central nervous system.

== Career ==
Ehrlich has held many academic appointments throughout his career. He was formerly an assistant professor and then an associate professor with tenure at the University of Pittsburgh between 1990 and 1997. Since 1997 he has served as the director of research in the Department of Otolaryngology at the Drexel University College of Medicine (DUCoM).

Ehrlich held an appointment as a Technical Specialist at the State University of New York Research Foundation between 1984 and 1988. From 1997 till 2013, he held an appointment as the managing director at the Allegheny General Hospital/Allegheny Singer Research Institute. He is the president of the International Lyme and Associated Diseases Educational Foundation (ILADEF), and has served as a consultant for IMS and Teltech. He directs the Center for Genomic Sciences (CGS), and the Center for Advanced Microbial Processing (CAMP), the Center for Surgical Infections and Biofilms, and Genomics Core Facility at the Drexel University College of Medicine as the executive director. Additionally, he directs the Meta-Omics Core Facility at the Sidney Kimmel Cancer Center, which is a National Cancer Institute designated Cancer Center that encompasses Thomas Jefferson University and Drexel University.

== Research ==
Ehrlich's research works span the fields of molecular diagnostics, genomics, molecular medicine, and evolutionary biology with particular emphases on chronic bacterial pathogenesis, comparative bacterial genomics, and human genetics.

=== Biofilm, and identification of anti-biofilm drugs ===
Ehrlich's research on the etiology of chronic middle-ear disease (otitis media) in the early 1990s in which he exploited the potential of the emergent field of molecular diagnostics led to his development of the biofilm paradigm of chronic infectious diseases.

Ehrlich's biofilm work began with chronic otitis media with effusion (COME) and soon encompassed other chronic respiratory mucosal diseases including sinusitis; adenoiditis; pharyngitis; and chronic obstructive pulmonary disease (COPD). Using the chinchilla (Chinchilla lanigera) experimental model of COME his research supported the hypothesis that biofilm formation was a key driver in its pathogenesis. Subsequently, he led a team that directly demonstrated the formation of bacterial biofilms on the middle-ear mucosa of children who had failed multiple rounds of antibiotic therapy, yet still suffered from either COME or recurrent OM.

Ehrlich then developed a metabolic framework for understanding biofilm biology which he subsequently used for the development of a science for the treatment and management of infectious diseases.

While examining the role of biofilms in multiple otolaryngologic infections, Ehrlich concluded that understanding their physiology would be key to the formulation of effective treatment strategies as biofilm bacteria are resistant to classical antimicrobial therapies. With this focus on developing methods for ameliorating chronic bacterial infections, he led a research team to identify novel bacterial treatment targets and to find small molecular inhibitors that could serve as anti-biofilm drugs leading to the creation of the biotech company ASR BIO Inc. This work built upon his realization that biofilm resistance to antibiotics was not primarily due to issues of penetration, but rather, as he illustrated, due to metabolic quiescence attributable to oxygen limitation and a lack of fermentable substrates as he demonstrated using Pseudomonas aeruginosa as a model biofilm organism. This anti-biofilm research program has resulted in multiple patent applications and employs a hybrid in silico and laboratory pipeline for the identification and characterization of small inhibitor molecules which can be used in combination with traditional antibiotics for the treatment of biofilm infection by targeting the bacterial stringent response. In another research study, his team reported that with the controlled use of salicylic acid-releasing polymers, the biofilm formation can be hindered on plastic catheters. In addition, he evaluated the issues associated with the biofilm infections in the orthopedic field for which he developed and promulgated the concept of "intelligent implants" that would serve both their structural/dynamic functions while simultaneously self-monitoring and treating biofilm infections "in situ" as they occurred.

=== Clinical molecular diagnostics ===
One of Ehrlich's earliest works used the polymerase chain reaction and focused on the detection of human retroviruses including, HTLV-I and HIV. In these studies, he used nucleic acid amplification combined with oligonucleotide-detection procedures to diagnose HIV in the infected strains. More recently, his work during the COVID-19 pandemic included the establishment of a molecular diagnostics facility that provided both detection and sequence-based typing for SARS-CoV-2. In addition, he collaborated with a group of physicians to develop appropriate precautionary measures, and recommendations regarded as essential prior to the resuming of the Elective Orthopaedic Surgery with a strict emphasis on preventing the spread of COVID-19.

Much of Ehrlich's clinical and translational research has focused on the integration of technologies in bacterial genomics which have led to the identification of pathogens etiologically associated with various pathogenic disease processes. Through his early adoption and development of species-specific pan-domain molecular diagnostics including the Ibis Biosciences T5000 and his lab-developed, long-read 16S microbiome assay he has played a role in demonstrating that many inflammatory conditions are actually chronic polymicrobial infections in which the pathogens remain largely unculturable. In particular, he has used these approaches in the study of orthopedic, neurosurgical, and wound infections to identify both known and novel pathogens in multiple conditions including: periprosthetic 'sterile' loosenings; suspected infected arthroplasties; 'aseptic' arthritis; and ventroperitoneal shunts as well as chronic non-healing wounds.

Given the increasing prevalence of tick-borne diseases, Ehrlich along with a team of researchers expanded their research into the pathogenesis, fundamental biology, and detection strategies, and conducted a large-scale sequencing among the Borreliaceae for the formulation of a family-level pan-genome to be used for the development of species-specific and strain-specific diagnostics.

=== Gene mapping and cloning ===
Ehrlich's research works have led to the mapping and cloning of multiple human disease genes (alleles) as we well as the identification and characterization of virulence genes within pathogens through his introduction of statistical genetics and machine-learning methods to the characterization of unannotated bacterial genes. Most notably he led the research that identified the genetic bases for several craniofacial abnormalities and hereditary pancreatitis; in which multiple mutations in the cationic trypsinogen gene were shown to be associated with the hereditary pancreatitis (HP). Moreover, the research findings on hereditary pancreatitis also illustrated that the mutation in cationic trypsinogen gene is associated with the recurrent acute and chronic pancreatitis, and argued that the chronic pancreatitis could be due to the recurrent pancreatitis.

Ehrlich's distributed genome hypothesis which predicted the bacterial pangenome led to his application of statistical genetics for the identification of bacterial distributed genes that are associated with virulence and tissue tropism. This approach led to his identification and characterization of Msf1, an Haemophilus influenzae virulence factor that provides for the bacterium's survival and trafficking in human macrophages. In addition, he has investigated the bacterial evolution underlying bacterial adaptation to the human lung environment.

Ehrlich's recent research on the etiology of Alzheimer's disease (AD) is based on the argument that chronic biofilm infections contribute to the development of AD by continually triggering the brain's antimicrobial peptide response. This leads to an accumulation of the Abeta peptide and its polymeric form, beta-amyloid that is, at least in part, responsible for triggering the symptoms of dementia. According to his research, a complex polymicrobial dynamic contributes to the pathogenicity of Alzheimer. Speaking with Katie Clark for the Drexel University Research Magazine, he commented, "Despite the billions that have been spent, we have no effective drugs, we have done nothing to change the natural history of the disease... The approach people are taking is not right."

== Awards and honors ==
- 1995 — Alumni Citation Award, Alfred University
- 2014 — Elected Fellow, American Association for the Advancement of Science
- 2017 — Established Investigator Award, Institute for Molecular Medicine & Infectious Disease
- 2022 — Elected Fellow, American Academy of Microbiology
- 2023 - Member, American Society of Microbiology Distinguished Lecture (ASMDL). panelhttps://asm.org/press-releases/2024/september/asm-announces-2024-2025-distinguished-lecturer-asm
- 2025 - Elected Foundational Fellow, International Lyme and Associated Diseases Society. https://www.ilads.org/fellowship-program/

== Bibliography ==
=== Books ===
- Culture-Negative Orthopedic Biofilm Infections. Springer Verlag Series on Biofilms (2012) ISBN 978-3-642-29553-9
- PCR-Based Diagnostics in Infectious Disease (2004) ISBN 978-0-86542-252-0

=== Selected articles ===
- Whitcomb, D. C., Gorry, M. C., Preston, R. A., Furey, W., Sossenheimer, M. J., Ulrich, C. D., ... & Ehrlich, G. D. (1996). Hereditary pancreatitis is caused by a mutation in the cationic trypsinogen gene. Nature genetics, 14(2), 141–145.
- Sauer, K., Camper, A. K., Ehrlich, G. D., Costerton, J. W., & Davies, D. G. (2002). Pseudomonas aeruginosa displays multiple phenotypes during development as a biofilm.
- Costerton, W., Veeh, R., Shirtliff, M., Pasmore, M., Post, C., & Ehrlich, G. (2003). The application of biofilm science to the study and control of chronic bacterial infections. The Journal of clinical investigation, 112(10), 1466–1477.
- Borriello, G., Werner, E., Roe, F., Kim, A. M., Ehrlich, G. D., & Stewart, P. S. (2004). Oxygen limitation contributes to antibiotic tolerance of Pseudomonas aeruginosa in biofilms. Antimicrobial agents and chemotherapy, 48(7), 2659–2664.
- Hall-Stoodley, L., Hu, F. Z., Gieseke, A., Nistico, L., Nguyen, D., Hayes, J., ... & Kerschner, J. E. (2006). Direct detection of bacterial biofilms on the middle-ear mucosa of children with chronic otitis media. Jama, 296(2), 202–211.
- Parvizi, J., Gehrke, T., Krueger, C. A., Chisari, E., Citak, M., Van Onsem, S., ... & Zhou, Y. (2020). Resuming elective orthopaedic surgery during the COVID-19 pandemic: guidelines developed by the International Consensus Group (ICM). The Journal of bone and joint surgery. American volume, 102(14), 1205.
- Dupré, D. A., Cheng, B., Kreft, R., Nistico, L., Ehrlich, G. D., Averick, S., & Altman, D. T. (2022). The Presence of Biofilms in Instrumented Spinal Fusions. Genetic Testing and Molecular Biomarkers, 26(7–8), 375–381.
