= Zebra striping =

Table coloring to improve readability

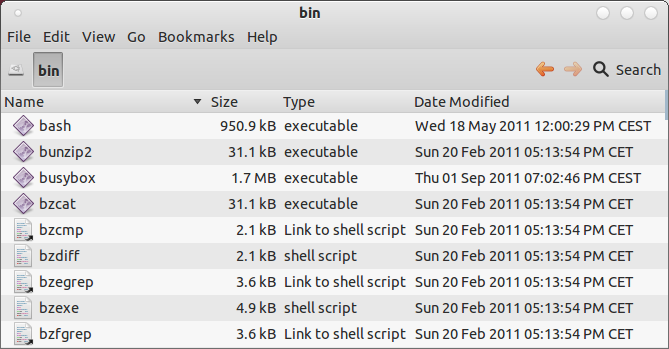
Zebra striping used in Nautilus.

Zebra striping is the coloring of every other row of a table to improve readability. Especially in wide tables with numerous columns, it can be difficult for a reader following a row to be confident that their gaze has not strayed to an adjacent row without some means of distinguishing rows at a glance. Although zebra striping has been used for a long time to improve readability, there is relatively little data on how much it helps.

== Implementation ==
In HTML documents, zebra striping can be implemented using the Cascading Style Sheets :nth-child(even) pseudo-selector.

The Bootstrap CSS framework features zebra striping through the .table-striped class.

== See also ==
- Green bar paper, continuous sheets pre-printed with green rows, once-common stationery used when physically printing tabular data
