= Milton Weinstein =

American health scientist

Milton C. Weinstein is an American health decision scientist and the Henry J. Kaiser Professor of Health Policy and Management at Harvard T.H. Chan School of Public Health. He is also a Professor of Medicine at Harvard Medical School. Publishing over 300 papers in major journals in multiple fields, he is recognized for his current work around affordable healthcare and its improvements. He received four degrees from Harvard University, an AB and MA (applied mathematics 1970), MPP 1972), and PhD (Public Policy 1973).
