= Journal of Medical Biography =

- Discipline: History of medicine
- Language: English

Publication details
- History: 1993-present
- Publisher: SAGE Publishing on behalf of the Royal Society of Medicine (United Kingdom)
- Frequency: Quarterly
- Impact factor: 0.2 (2022)

Standard abbreviations
- ISO 4: J. Med. Biogr.

Indexing
- ISSN: 0967-7720 (print); 1758-1087 (web)
- LCCN: 96656201
- OCLC no.: 488592086

Links
- Journal homepage; Online access; Online archive

The Journal of Medical Biography is a peer-reviewed academic journal established in 1993 and published by SAGE Publishing, covering the lives of people in or associated with medicine, including medical figures and well-known characters from history and their conditions. The journal is abstracted and indexed in PubMed/MEDLINE, and Scopus.

According to the Journal Citation Reports, the journal has a 2022 impact factor of 0.2.
