= Stem Cells and Development =

Academic journal

- Discipline: Cell biology
- Language: English
- Edited by: Graham C. Parker

Publication details
- Former name(s): Journal of Hematotherapy; Journal of Hematotherapy & Stem Cell Research
- History: 1992–present
- Publisher: Mary Ann Liebert, Inc.
- Frequency: Biweekly
- Impact factor: 3.147 (2018)

Standard abbreviations
- ISO 4: Stem Cells Dev.

Indexing
- ISSN: 1547-3287 (print); 1557-8534 (web)
- LCCN: 2003215616
- OCLC no.: 1031869656

Links
- Journal homepage; Online access; Online archive

Stem Cells and Development is a biweekly peer-reviewed scientific journal covering cell biology, with a specific focus on biomedical applications of stem cells. It was established in 1992 as the Journal of Hematotherapy, and was renamed the Journal of Hematotherapy & Stem Cell Research in 1999. The journal obtained its current name in 2004. It is published by Mary Ann Liebert, Inc. and the editor-in-chief is Graham C. Parker (Wayne State University School of Medicine). According to the Journal Citation Reports, the journal has a 2018 impact factor of 3.147.
