= Zebrafish (journal) =

Zoology journal

- Discipline: Biology
- Language: English

Publication details
- History: 2004–present
- Publisher: Mary Ann Liebert
- Frequency: Quarterly

Standard abbreviations
- ISO 4: Zebrafish

Indexing
- ISSN: 1545-8547 (print); 1557-8542 (web)

Zebrafish is a quarterly peer-reviewed journal focusing on research using the zebrafish and related species. It is published by Mary Ann Liebert. It was founded in 2004 by Paul Collodi, professor of animal science at Purdue University.
