= Autism in Adulthood =

- Discipline: Autism spectrum
- Language: English
- Edited by: Christina Nicolaidis

Publication details
- History: 2019–present
- Publisher: Mary Ann Liebert
- Frequency: Quarterly
- Open access: Hybrid

Standard abbreviations
- ISO 4: Autism Adulthood

Indexing
- ISSN: 2573-9581 (print); 2573-959X (web)
- LCCN: 2017200591
- OCLC no.: 994303426

Links
- Journal homepage; Online archive

Autism in Adulthood is a quarterly peer-reviewed academic journal covering research across a range of disciplines on all aspects of autism spectrum disorders in adults. It was established in 2019 and is published by Mary Ann Liebert. The founding editor-in-chief is Christina Nicolaidis (Portland State University).

== Abstracting and indexing ==
The journal is abstracted and indexed in:

- CINAHL
- Emerging Sources Citation Index
- PsycINFO
- Scopus
