= Journal of Correctional Health Care =

- Discipline: Health care
- Language: English
- Edited by: John R. Miles

Publication details
- History: 1994-present
- Publisher: SAGE Publications
- Frequency: Quarterly
- Impact factor: 0.692 (2017)

Standard abbreviations
- ISO 4: J. Correct. Health Care

Indexing
- ISSN: 1078-3458
- LCCN: 95652812
- OCLC no.: 31056633

Links
- Journal homepage; Online access; Online archive

The Journal of Correctional Health Care is a quarterly peer-reviewed healthcare journal that publishes papers four times a year in the field of health care in correctional settings. The editor-in-chief is John R. Miles. It was established 1994 and is currently published by SAGE Publications in association with the National Commission on Correctional Health Care.

== Abstracting and indexing ==
The Journal of Correctional Health Care is abstracted and indexed in:

- CINAHL
- Criminal Justice Abstracts
- Science Citation Index
- MEDLINE
- PsycINFO
- SafetyLit
