= Childhood Obesity (journal) =

- Discipline: Obesity, pediatrics
- Language: English
- Edited by: Joseph A. Skelton

Publication details
- Former names: Obesity Management, Obesity and Weight Management
- History: 2005-present
- Publisher: Mary Ann Liebert, Inc.
- Frequency: Bimonthly
- Impact factor: 2.426 (2018)

Standard abbreviations
- ISO 4: Child. Obes.

Indexing
- ISSN: 2153-2168 (print); 2153-2176 (web)
- LCCN: 2010204324
- OCLC no.: 778617561

Links
- Journal homepage; Online access

Childhood Obesity is a bimonthly peer-reviewed medical journal covering childhood obesity. It was established in 2005 as Obesity Management, and changed its name to Obesity and Weight Management in 2009. It acquired its current name in 2010. It is published by Mary Ann Liebert, Inc. and the editor-in-chief is Joseph A. Skelton (Wake Forest School of Medicine). According to the Journal Citation Reports, the journal has a 2018 impact factor of 2.426.
