= Integrative Biology =

Peer-reviewed scientific journal

- Discipline: Biology
- Language: English
- Edited by: Sylvain Costes

Publication details
- History: 2008–present
- Publisher: Oxford University Press (United Kingdom)
- Frequency: Monthly
- Impact factor: 1.5 (2023)

Standard abbreviations
- ISO 4: Integr. Biol.
- NLM: Integr Biol (Camb)

Indexing
- ISSN: 1757-9694 (print); 1757-9708 (web)

Links
- Journal homepage

Integrative Biology is a monthly peer-reviewed scientific journal covering the interface between biology and the fields of physics, chemistry, engineering, imaging, and informatics. It was published by the Royal Society of Chemistry from its launch in 2008 to 2018. Since then, it has been published by Oxford University Press. Its 2023 impact factor is 1.5.
