= AIDS Research and Human Retroviruses =

- Discipline: AIDS, HIV, human retrovirus
- Language: English
- Edited by: R. Keith Reeves and Lish Ndhlovu

Publication details
- Former name: AIDS Research
- History: 1983–1986: AIDS Research; 1987–present: AIDS Research and Human Retroviruses
- Publisher: Mary Ann Liebert (United States)
- Impact factor: 1.805 (2018)

Standard abbreviations
- ISO 4: AIDS Res. Hum. Retrovir.
- NLM: AIDS Res Hum Retroviruses

Indexing
- ISSN: 0889-2229 (print); 1931-8405 (web)
- OCLC no.: 13812822

Links
- Journal homepage; Online Access; RSS

AIDS Research and Human Retroviruses is a peer-reviewed scientific journal focusing on HIV/AIDS research, as well as on human retroviruses and their related diseases. The journal was founded in 1983 as AIDS Research, and acquired its current name in 1987. It is published by Mary Ann Liebert, and edited by R. Keith Reeves and Lish Ndhlovu.

It is the official journal of the International Retrovirology Association.

== Indexing and abstracting ==
AIDS Research and Human Retroviruses is indexed and abstracted in the following databases:

- Biological Abstracts
- BIOSIS Previews
- CAB Abstracts
- Current Awareness in Biological Sciences (CABS)
- Current Contents/Life Sciences
- Derwent Drug File
- BIOBASE
- EMBASE/Excerpta Medica
- ISI Custom Information Services
- Journal Citation Reports/Science Edition
- MEDLINE
- Prous Science Integrity
- Science Citation Index
- Scopus
- SIIC Databases

As of 2026, the H-index is 100.
