= Delcath Systems =

Delcath Systems, Inc
- Type: Public
- Traded as: Nasdaq: DCTH
- Industry: pharmaceutical and medical devices
- Founded: 1988
- Headquarters: Queensbury, New York
- Website: https://delcath.com/

Delcath Systems, Inc. (NASDAQ: DCTH) is a publicly traded specialty pharmaceutical and medical device company, that develops percutaneous perfusion technologies for the targeted administration of high-dose chemotherapeutic agents to specific organs or regions of the body. Based in Queensbury, New York, the company has an intellectual property portfolio consisting of 28 patents worldwide. Delcath's Percutaneous Hepatic Perfusion (PHP) is currently undergoing Phase II and Phase III trials against tumors in the liver. Delcath has a Cooperative Research and Development Agreement (CRADA) with the National Cancer Institute and has received Fast Track and a Special Protocol Assessment from the Food and Drug Administration for its use of melphalan in treating unresectable liver tumors. PHP, also known as the Delcath System, is tested for the treatment of metastatic melanoma in the liver and for primary liver cancer and metastatic hepatic malignancies from neuroendocrine cancers and adenocarcinomas, as well as patients with melanoma who previously received isolated perfusion. Chemotherapy is usually delivered intravenously, although a number of agents can be administered orally (e.g. specialty drugs, melphalan (trade name Alkeran), busulfan, capecitabine).

== Phase III melanoma trial enrolling ==
- University of Pittsburgh Medical Center
- National Cancer Institute in Bethesda, Maryland
- Albany Medical Center in Albany, New York
- John Wayne Cancer Center in Santa Monica, California
- Moffitt Cancer Center in Tampa, Florida
- Morristown Memorial Hospital in Morristown, New Jersey
- Providence Cancer Center in Portland, Oregon
- St. Luke's Cancer Center of Bethlehem, Pennsylvania
- Swedish Medical Center in Englewood, Colorado
- University of Maryland Medical Center in Baltimore, Maryland
- University of Texas Medical Branch in Galveston, Texas
