= National Quality Forum =

American non-profit organization

- Abbreviation: NQF
- Type: non-profit
- Purpose: promotes patient protections and healthcare
- Location: United States

National Quality Forum (NQF) is a United States–based non-profit membership organization that promotes patient protections and healthcare quality through measurement and public reporting. It was established in 1999 based on recommendations by the President's Advisory Commission on Consumer Protection and Quality in the Health Care Industry. NQF’s membership comprises over 400 organizations, representing consumers, health plans, medical professionals, employers, government and other public health agencies, pharmaceutical and medical device companies, and other quality improvement organizations. NQF has helped develop guidelines on palliative care.

On August 16, 2023, the Joint Commission acquired the National Quality Forum. Jonathan Perlin, CEO of the Joint Commission, stated: "We believe that by combining the unique capabilities of each organization, we can better support focused improvement in healthcare. Our goals are shared across the patient, consumer, payer, purchaser, and provider communities: Safer, higher value, more equitable, and more compassionate healthcare".

Some researchers have discussed difficulties in following NQF proposals.

== Consensus-based entity ==
NQF operates as a consensus-based entity in the creation of voluntary consensus standards as defined by the National Technology Transfer Act and Advancement act of 1995 and the Office of Management and Budget Circular A-119, which directs US government agencies to participate in the development and use of voluntary consensus standards. These consensus standards are largely concerned with measuring and publicly reporting on performance in healthcare settings. NQF uses a multi-step consensus development process to vet performance measures created by public and private measure developers including the NCQA, CMS, and Physician Consortium for Performance Improvement (PCPI). NQF endorses those measures that meet the following criteria:

- Importance to measure and report
- Scientific acceptability of measure properties
- Feasibility
- Usability and use
- Related and competing measures

The endorsement process has historically taken 12 months to complete, but NQF streamlined its process in 2014, reducing the process to seven months.

== Programs ==
NQF, under contract to the federal government, played a significant role in the creation of the national quality strategy. Under contract to the federal government, NQF convenes a consensus body to recommend measures for specific federal programs via the Measures Application Partnership. On February 8, 2023, CMS awarded Battelle Memorial Institute a $53 million contract to procure the services of a consensus-based entity, necessary to support various duties pertaining to health care performance measurement, as required under Section 1890 of the Social Security Act. As a result, the National Quality Forum is no longer the federal contractor responsible for endorsing measures, or recommending measures for use in federal programs.

NQF is best known for its report on Serious Reportable Events (SREs or never events) in 2009. NQF created the term to refer to 28 preventable, serious, and unambiguous adverse events that should never occur in a healthcare setting.

A 2006 report published in the American Journal of Medical Quality reviewed "facilitators and barriers" to implementing the National Quality Forum's recommended hospital practices. It identified executive support, administrative support and education and training as key factors, while "resistance to change" was the most difficult barrier to overcome.

== Controversies ==
On January 9, 2013, the U.S. Department of Justice and 49 U.S States and the District of Columbia reached an out-of-court settlement with CareFusion, a medical products company, for US$40 million in a whistleblower suit that alleged that the company had paid Charles Denham over US$11 million to influence medical standards settings in favor of the company while he was involved with NQF. In a press release, NQF distanced itself from Dr. Denham and his foundation TMIT while stating "reference to [the CareFusion product] was removed from the draft Safe Practices report after an NQF ad hoc review did not find sufficient evidence to support one skin preparation over another."
