= American Journal of Medical Quality =

- Discipline: Quality control in medicine
- Language: English
- Edited by: Pranavi V. Sreeramoju

Publication details
- History: 1992–present
- Publisher: Wolters Kluwer Health
- Frequency: Bimonthly
- Impact factor: 1.3 (2024)

Standard abbreviations
- ISO 4: Am. J. Med. Qual.

Indexing
- ISSN: 1062-8606 (print); 1555-824X (web)
- LCCN: 94660087
- OCLC no.: 25797414

Links
- Journal homepage; Online access; Online archive

The American Journal of Medical Quality is a bimonthly peer-reviewed academic journal covering quality control in medicine. The editor-in-chief is Pranavi V. Sreeramoju (University of Pennsylvania Perelman School of Medicine). It was established in 1986 and was formerly published by SAGE Publications in association with the American College of Medical Quality. Wolters Kluwer Health has published it since January 2021.

== Abstracting and indexing ==
The journal is abstracted and indexed in Scopus and the Science Citation Index Expanded. According to the Journal Citation Reports, the journal has a 2024 impact factor of 1.3.
