= Samira =

- Pronunciation: /sæˈmiːrə/
- Gender: Both

Origin
- Languages: 1. Sanskrit; 2. Arabic; 3. Persian
- Meaning: 1. "breeze, wind, Vāyu"; 2. "night-companion" 3. "princess"

Other names
- Related names: Samir, Samaira

Samira (also spelled Samirah, Sameera, Sameerah and Semira; Sanskrit: समीर, romanized: samīra Arabic: سميرة Persian: سميرا pronounced [saˈmiːra]) is a Sanskrit, Arabic, or Persian given name. In Sanskrit, Sameera or Samira (Sanskrit: समीरः, romanized: samīraḥ) is a feminine given-name, meaning "breeze, wind," or "Vāyu, the wind deity". Many anglicize their name to Samīr or Sameer. In Arabic, the feminine name is derived from the root s-m-r ("to spend the night in talking"), ultimately meaning "night-companion", "entertaining companion", "the one with lively conversation". The masculine version of this name is Samir. In some Arabic and Persian speaking communities, the name honors Semiramis, a historical figure and Princess, and later queen of Assyria. The name has taken on the common demonym of “princess”. It can also be spelled as Semira. Notable people with the name include:

== Given name ==
=== Sameera ===
- Sameera Aziz (born 1979), Saudi media personality, social worker, radio host, and businesswoman
- Sameera Al Bitar (born 1990), Olympic swimmer from Bahrain
- Sameera Fazili, American attorney and public official
- Sameera Gunaratne (born 1997), Sri Lankan cricketer
- Sameera Moussa (1917–1952), Egyptian nuclear scientist
- Sameera Perera (born 1988), Sri Lankan cricketer
- Sameera bint Ibrahim Rajab, Bahraini politician
- Sameera Reddy (born 1980), Indian film actress
- Sameera Sadamal (born 1993), Sri Lankan cricketer
- Sameera Saneesh (born 1983), Indian costume designer in Malayalam film
- Sameera Sherief (born 1988), Indian actress and producer
- Sameera de Zoysa (born 1987), Sri Lankan first-class cricketer

=== Samira ===
- Samira Abbassy (born 1965), Iranian-born British painter
- Samira Ahmed (born 1968), British television reporter
- Samira Ahmed (author), American author
- Samira Mohamed Ali (born 1985), Indian model and actress
- Samira Alikhanzadeh (born 1967), Iranian artist and painter
- Samira Alkhatib (1945–2021), Palestinian poet and writer
- Samira Amirova (born 1998), Uzbek rhythmic gymnast
- Samira Asghari (born 1994), Afghan member of the International Olympic Committee
- Samira Awad (born 2000), Lebanese footballer
- Samira Azzam (1927–1967), Palestinian writer, broadcaster, and translator
- Samira Bawumia (born 1980), Ghanaian politician and Second Lady the Ghana
- Samira Bellil (1972–2004), French feminist who worked for women's rights in Muslim settings
- Samira Besic, German singer of Bosnian origin of the Eurodance group Maxx
- Samira Brahmia (born 1970), Franco-Algerian singer-songwriter and actress
- Samira Ćosović (born 1973), Serbian politician
- Samira Efendi (born 1991), Azerbaijani singer
- Samira bint Abdullah Al-Faisal, Saudi princess and disability advocate
- Samira Farouk, American nephrologist
- Samira Fazal (born 1976), Pakistani author and screenwriter
- Samira Abu Ghazaleh (1928–2017), Palestinian poet, scholar, professor, political activist, and soldier
- Samira Guerioua (born 1982/83), Algerian para powerlifter
- Samira Gutoc (born 1974), Filipino journalist and politician
- Samira Abdullah Halaykah, Palestinian politician
- Samira Hashi (born 1991), Somali-British model, social activist and community worker
- Samira Hurem (born 1972), Bosnian football manager and former player
- Samira Ibrahim (born 1987), Egyptian activist
- Samira Islam, Saudi Arabian pharmacologist and scholar
- Samira Jassim (born 1958), Iraqi terrorist
- Samira Kawas, Lebanese producer and actress
- Samira Kentrić (born 1976), Slovenian visual artist and illustrator
- Samira Khalil, Syrian dissident, political detainee, and revolutionary activist
- Samira Khashoggi (1935–1986), Saudi Arabian author and the founder of Al Sharkiah magazine
- Samira Kiani, Iranian-American medical researcher
- Samira Kitman (born 1984), Afghani calligrapher and miniaturist
- Samira Koppikar, Indian music director, composer, singer, and songwriter
- Samira Lui (born 1998), Italian showgirl and model
- Samira Magroun (born 1987), Tunisian actress
- Samira Makhmalbaf (born 1980), Iranian film director
- Samira Manners (born 2000), British-Swedish singer-songwriter
- Samira al-Māni' (1935–2026), Iraqi writer
- Samira Marti (born 1994), Swiss politician
- Samira al-Masalma, Syrian journalist and newspaper editor
- Samira Merai (born 1963), Tunisian doctor and politician
- Samira Mezeghrane (born 1979), French long-distance runner
- Samira Mighty (born 1996), English television personality and actress
- Samirah Moody (born 2002), American sprinter
- Samira bint Mohamed Al-Moosa, Omani diplomat
- Samira Mubareka (born 1972), Canadian clinical scientist
- Samira Musah, American biomedical engineer and professor
- Samira Mustafaeva (born 1993), Russian-Azerbaijani rhythmic gymnast
- Samira Saleh Ali al-Naimi (1963–2014), Iraqi human rights activist and lawyer
- Samira Nasr (born 1970), Canadian journalist and fashion editor of Lebanese and Trinidadian descent
- Samira Nawa (born 1988), Danish politician
- Samira Negrouche (born 1980), Algerian writer and poet
- Samira Ouass (born 1992), Moroccan weightlifter
- Samira Rafaela (born 1989), Dutch politician
- Samira Raif (born 1974), Moroccan long-distance runner
- Samira Rathod (born 1963), Indian architect, furniture designer, writer, and teacher
- Samira Rocha (born 1989), Brazilian handball player
- Samira Sabou (born 1981), Nigerien journalist and blogger.
- Samira Said (born 1958), Moroccan pop singer
- Samira Samii (born 1977), Iranian-German sports agent and columnist
- Samira Saraya (born 1975), Palestinian actor, filmmaker, poet, and artist
- Samira bint Abdullah Al Saud, Saudi disability advocate, philanthropist, and royal
- Samira Shahbandar (born 1946), Saddam Hussein's second wife
- Samira Siahrostami, Iranian-Canadian computational chemist
- Samira Sitail (born 1964), Moroccan journalist and diplomat
- Samira Suleman (born 1991), Ghanaian footballer
- Samira Tewfik (born 1935), Lebanese Syrian singer of Bedouin dialect
- Samira Vera-Cruz (born 1990), Cape Verdean film director, producer, editor, and actress
- Samira Wiley (born 1987), American actress

=== Semira ===
- Semira Adamu (1978–1998), Nigerian asylum seeker who was suffocated to death
- Semira Killebrew (born 2001), American sprinter

== Fictional characters ==
- Samira, The Desert Rose, a playable champion character in the MOBA video game League of Legends
- Samira Mohan, a character in HBO Max TV show The Pitt, played by Supriya Ganesh
- Samirah al-Abbas, a character in Rick Riordan's novel Magnus Chase and the Gods of Asgard
- Samira in Siba Shakib's novel Samira and Samir
- Princess Samira, a princess in Shimmer and Shine

== See also ==
- Sameera (disambiguation)
- Samara
- Samaira, similar name of unknown etymology
- Samir, masculine form of the name
