= Solomon's Temple =

Temple in Jerusalem in Abrahamic religions

Solomon's Temple First Temple
- בַּיִת רִאשׁוֹן
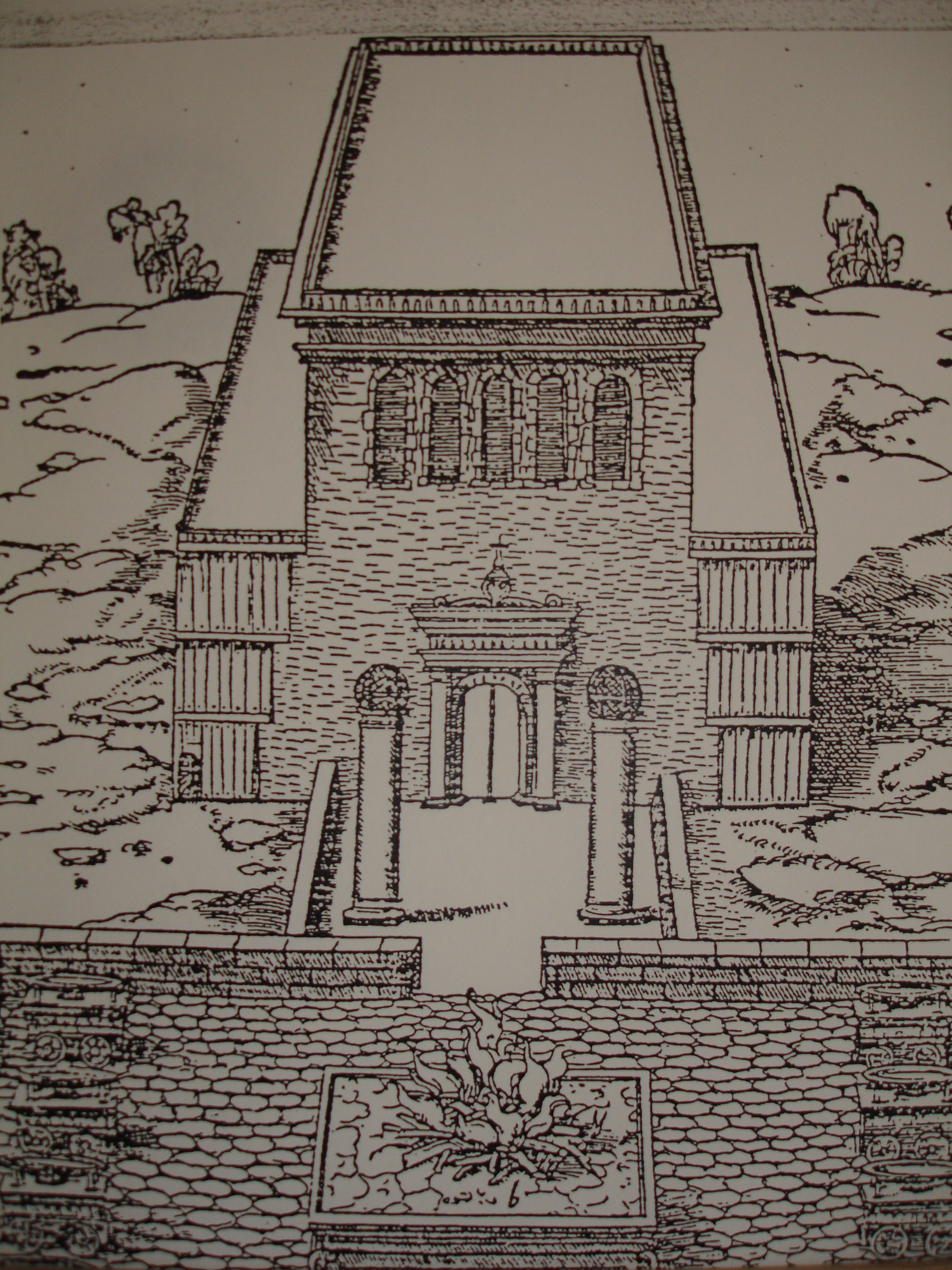
- 16th century depiction by François Vatable

- Location within the Old City of Jerusalem Location within Jerusalem (modern municipal borders) Location within the State of Israel

Religion
- Affiliation: Yahwism
- Deity: Yahweh
- Leadership: High Priest of Israel

Location
- Location: Temple Mount, Jerusalem
- Country: Kingdom of Judah (at the time of destruction)
- Coordinates: 31°46′41″N 35°14′06″E

Architecture
- Founder: Unknown, but attributed to Solomon in the Hebrew Bible
- Completed: c. 10th–8th century BCE
- Destroyed: 587 BCE

Solomon's Temple, also known as the First Temple (Hebrew: בַּיִת רִאשׁוֹן, romanized: Bayyit Rīšōn, lit. 'First Temple'), was a Temple in Jerusalem believed to have existed between the 10th and 6th centuries BCE. Its description is largely based on narratives in the Hebrew Bible, in which it was commissioned by biblical king Solomon, the son of King David. It was reportedly destroyed during the siege of Jerusalem by Nebuchadnezzar II of the Neo-Babylonian Empire in 586 BCE. According to Josephus, this was 470 years after it was built.

Due to the extreme religious and political sensitivity of the site, no recent archaeological excavations have been conducted on the Temple Mount, and no positively identified remains of the destroyed temple have been found. Most modern scholars agree that the First Temple existed on the Temple Mount in Jerusalem by the time of the Babylonian siege, and there is significant debate among scholars over the date of its construction and the identity of its builder.

The Hebrew Bible, specifically within the Book of Kings, includes a detailed narrative about the construction's ordering by King Solomon, the penultimate ruler of the United Kingdom of Israel. It further credits Solomon as the placer of the Ark of the Covenant in the Holy of Holies, a windowless inner sanctum within the structure. Entry into the Holy of Holies was heavily restricted; the High Priest of Israel was the only authority permitted to enter the sanctuary, and only did so on Yom Kippur, carrying the blood of a sacrificial lamb and burning incense. In addition to serving as a religious building for worship, the First Temple also functioned as a place of assembly for the Israelites. The First Temple's destruction and the subsequent Babylonian captivity were both events that were seen as a fulfillment of biblical prophecies and thus affected Judaic religious beliefs. Trotter claims that this precipitated the Israelites' transition from either polytheism or monolatrism (as seen in Yahwism) to firm Jewish monotheism.

Previously, many scholars accepted the biblical narrative of the First Temple's construction by Solomon as authentic. During the 1980s, skeptical approaches to the biblical text as well as the archaeological record led some scholars to doubt whether there was any Temple in Jerusalem constructed as early as the 10th century BCE. Some scholars have suggested that the original structure built by Solomon was relatively modest, and was later rebuilt on a larger scale.

No direct evidence for the existence of Solomon's Temple has been found. Due to the extreme religious and political sensitivity of the site, no recent archaeological excavations have been conducted on the Temple Mount. Nineteenth and early-twentieth-century excavations around the Temple Mount did not identify "even a trace" of the complex. Some attribute this to the extensive building done in the area during Herod’s time.

Two 21st-century findings from the Israelite period in present-day Israel bear resemblance to Solomon's Temple as it is described in the Hebrew Bible: a shrine model from the early half of the 10th century BCE in Khirbet Qeiyafa; and the Tel Motza temple, dated to the 9th century BCE and located in the neighbourhood of Motza within West Jerusalem. The biblical description of Solomon's Temple also appears to share similarities with several Syro-Hittite temples of the same period discovered in modern-day Syria and Turkey, such as those in Ain Dara and Tell Tayinat.

Seventy years later, when Cyrus of Persia conquered Babylonia, he allowed the exiles to return to Judea and build the Second Temple.

== Location ==
Archeologist Israel Finkelstein writes that the exact location of the Temple is unknown. It is believed to have been situated upon the hill that forms the site of the Second Temple and present-day Temple Mount, where the Dome of the Rock is situated.

According to the Bible, Solomon's Temple was built on Mount Moriah in Jerusalem, where an angel of God had appeared to David (2 Chronicles 3:1). The site was originally a threshing floor David had purchased from Araunah the Jebusite (2 Samuel 24:18–25; 2 Chronicles 3:1).

Schmid and Rupprecht are of the view that the site of the temple used to be a Jebusite shrine that Solomon chose in an attempt to unify the Jebusites and Israelites.

== Biblical narrative ==
=== Construction ===
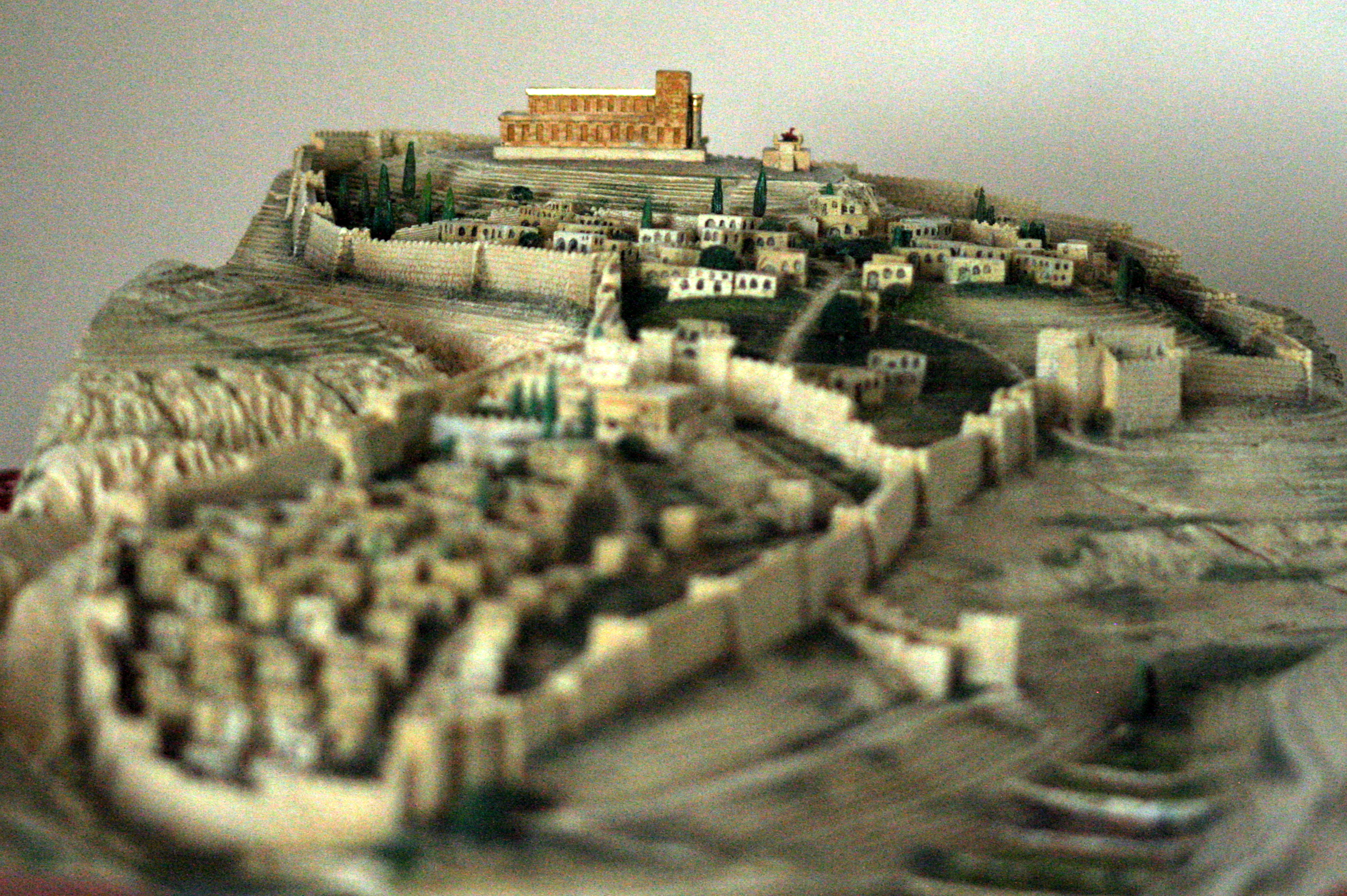
Modern-day reconstruction of Jerusalem during the reign of Solomon (10th century BCE) from Jerusalem Walls National Park. The temple stands on the original Mount Moriah, as it looked prior to its expansion by King Herod in the 1st century BCE.

According to 1 Kings, the foundation of the Temple is laid in Ziv (now known as the month of Iyar), the second month of the fourth year of Solomon's reign and construction is completed in Bul (now known as the month of Cheshvan), the eighth month of Solomon's eleventh year, thus taking about seven years.

The Hebrew Bible says that the Tyrians played a leading role in the construction of the Temple. The Second Book of Samuel mentions how David and Hiram forged an alliance. This friendship continues after Solomon succeeds David, and the two refer to each other as brothers. A literary account of how Hiram helps Solomon build the Temple is given in 1 Kings (chapters 5–9) and 2 Chronicles (chapters 2–7). Hiram agrees to Solomon's request to supply him with cedar and cypress trees for the construction of the Temple. He tells Solomon that he will send the trees by sea: "I will make them into rafts to go by the sea to the place that you indicate. I will have them broken up there for you to take away." In return for the lumber, Solomon sends him wheat and oil. Solomon also brings over a skilled craftsman from Tyre, also called Hiram (or Huram-abi), who oversees the construction of the Temple. Stonemasons from Gebal (Byblos) cut stones for the Temple.

Construction of the Temple took seven years. After completion of Solomon's palace (which took an additional 13 years) Solomon hands over twenty cities in the northwestern Galilee near Tyre as a repayment to Hiram. Hiram was not pleased with the gift, however, and asks "what are these towns that you have given me, my brother?". Hiram then calls them "the land of Cabul", and the writer of 1 Kings 9 says they were called by this name "to this day". Hiram however remains on friendly terms with Solomon.

The Second Book of Chronicles fills in some details of the construction not given in narrative brought in 1 Kings. It states that the trees sent as rafts were sent to the city of Joppa on the Mediterranean coast, and in return for the lumber supplied, Solomon, in addition to the wheat and oil, sent wine to Hiram.

=== Transfer of the Ark of the Covenant ===
According to biblical narrative, the purpose of Solomon’s Temple was as a House of God, a site in which God shall dwell (Deuteronomy 12:5) 1 Kings 8:1–9 and 2 Chronicles 5:2–10 record that in the seventh month of the year, during the Feast of Tabernacles, the priests and the Levites brought the Ark of the Covenant, which contained the Ten Commandments, from the City of David. Within the temple, the Ark was placed inside the Holy of Holies.

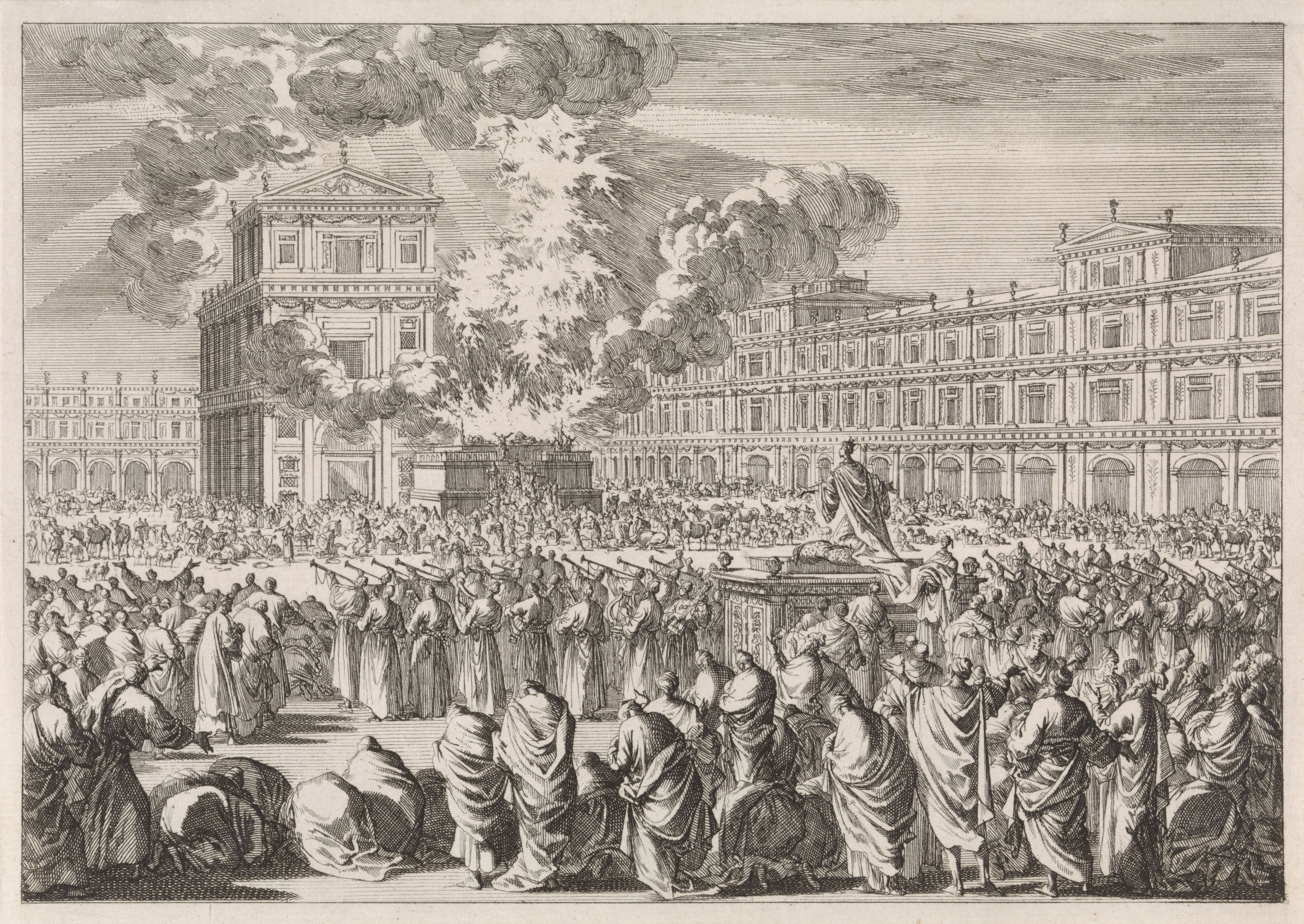
The Dedication of Solomon's Temple, by Jan Luyken (1700)

=== Dedication ===
1 Kings 8:10–66 and 2 Chronicles 6:1–42 recount the events of the temple's dedication. When the priests emerged from the holy of holies after placing the Ark there, the Temple was filled with an overpowering cloud that interrupted the dedication ceremony, "for the glory of the Lord had filled the house of the Lord [such that] the priests could not stand to minister" (1 Kings 8:10–11; 2 Chronicles 5:13, 14). Solomon interpreted the cloud as "[proof] that his pious work was accepted":

"The Lord has said that he would dwell in thick darkness. I have built you an exalted house, a place for you to dwell in forever."

— 1 Kings 8:12–13

The allusion is to Leviticus 16:2:

The Lord said to Moses: Tell your brother Aaron not to come just at any time into the sanctuary inside the curtain before the mercy seat that is upon the ark, or he will die; for I appear in the cloud upon the mercy seat.

The Pulpit Commentary notes that "Solomon had thus every warrant for connecting a theophany with the thick dark cloud".

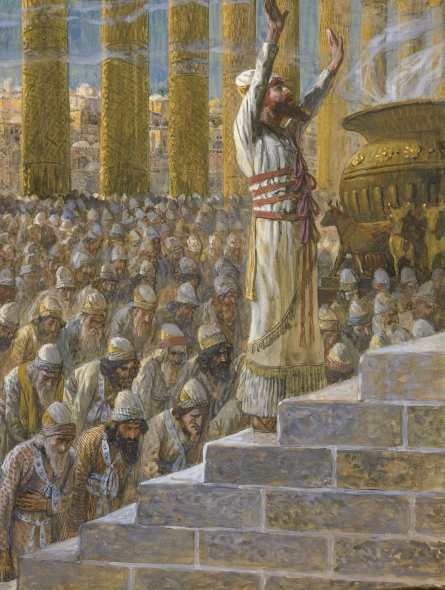
King Solomon dedicates the Temple at Jerusalem. Painting by James Tissot or follower, c. 1896–1902.

Solomon then led the whole assembly of Israel in prayer, noting that the construction of the temple represented a fulfilment of God's promise to David, dedicating the temple as a place of prayer and reconciliation for the people of Israel and for foreigners living in Israel, and highlighting the paradox that God who lives in the heavens cannot really be contained within a single building. The dedication was concluded with musical celebration and sacrifices said to have included "twenty-two thousand bulls and one hundred and twenty thousand sheep". These sacrifices were offered outside the temple, in "the middle of the court that was in front of the house of the Lord", because the altar inside the temple, despite its extensive dimensions, was not big enough for the offerings being made that day. The celebration lasted eight days and was attended by "very great assembly [gathered] from the entrance of Hamath to the Brook of Egypt". The subsequent feast of Tabernacles extended the whole celebration to 14 days, before the people were "sent away to their homes".

After the dedication, Solomon hears in a dream that God has heard his prayer, and God will continue to hear the prayers of the people of Israel if they adopt the four ways in which they could move God to action: humility, prayer, seeking his face, and turning from wicked ways. Conversely, if they turn aside and forsake God's commandments and worship other gods, then God will abandon the temple: "this house which I have sanctified for My name I will cast out of My sight".

=== Plunder ===
According to the biblical narrative, Solomon's Temple was plundered several times. In the fifth year of Rehoboam's reign (commonly dated to 926 BCE), Egyptian pharaoh Shishak (positively identified with Shoshenq I) took away treasures of the Temple and the king's house, as well as shields of gold that Solomon had made; Rehoboam replaced them with brass ones (1 Kings 14:25; 2 Chronicles 12:1–12). A century later, Jehoash, king of the northern Kingdom of Israel, advanced on Jerusalem, broke down a portion of the wall, and carried away the treasures of the Temple and the palace (2 Kings 14:13–14). Later, when Ahaz of Judah was threatened by defeat at the hands of Rezin of Aram-Damascus and Pekah of Israel, he turned to king Tiglath-Pileser IV for help. To persuade him, he "took the silver and gold that was found in the house of Yahweh, and in the treasures of the king's house, and sent it for a present to the King of Assyria" (2 Kings 16:8). At another critical juncture, Hezekiah cut off the gold from the doors and doorsteps of the temple he himself had overlaid, and gave it to king Sennacherib (2 Kings 18:15–16).

=== Joash's restoration ===
2 Kings 12:1–17 and 2 Chronicles 24:1–14 recount that King Joash and the priests of the temple organised a restoration programme funded from popular donations. The temple was restored to its original condition and further reinforced.

=== Destruction by the Babylonians ===
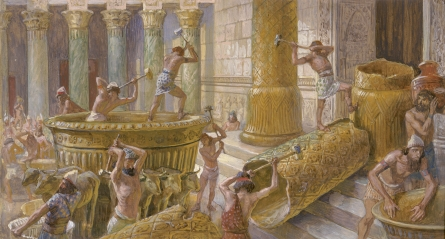
Chaldees destroy the Brazen Sea, Painting by James Tissot, c. 1900

According to the Bible, the Temple was plundered by King Nebuchadnezzar II of the Neo-Babylonian Empire when the Babylonians attacked Jerusalem during the brief reign of Jehoiachin c. 598 BCE (2 Kings 24:13).

A decade later, Nebuchadnezzar again besieged Jerusalem and after 30 months finally breached the city walls in 587/6 BCE. The city finally fell to his army in July 586/5 BCE. A month later, Nebuzaradan, commander of Nebuchadnezzar's guard, was sent to burn and demolish the city. According to the Bible, "he set fire to the Temple of Yahweh, the royal palace and all the houses of Jerusalem" (2 Kings 25:9). Everything worth plundering was then removed and taken to Babylon (2 Kings 25:13–17).

Jewish tradition holds that the Temple was destroyed on Tisha B'Av, the 9th day of Av (Hebrew calendar), the same date of the destruction of the Second Temple. Rabbinic sources state that the First Temple stood for 410 years and, based on the 2nd-century work Seder Olam Rabbah, place construction in 832 BCE and destruction in 422 BCE (3338 AM), 165 years later than secular estimates. The Jewish historian Josephus says; "the temple was burnt four hundred and seventy years, six months, and ten days after it was built".

Solomon's Temple was subsequently replaced with the Second Temple in 515 BCE, following Jewish return from exile.

== Architecture ==
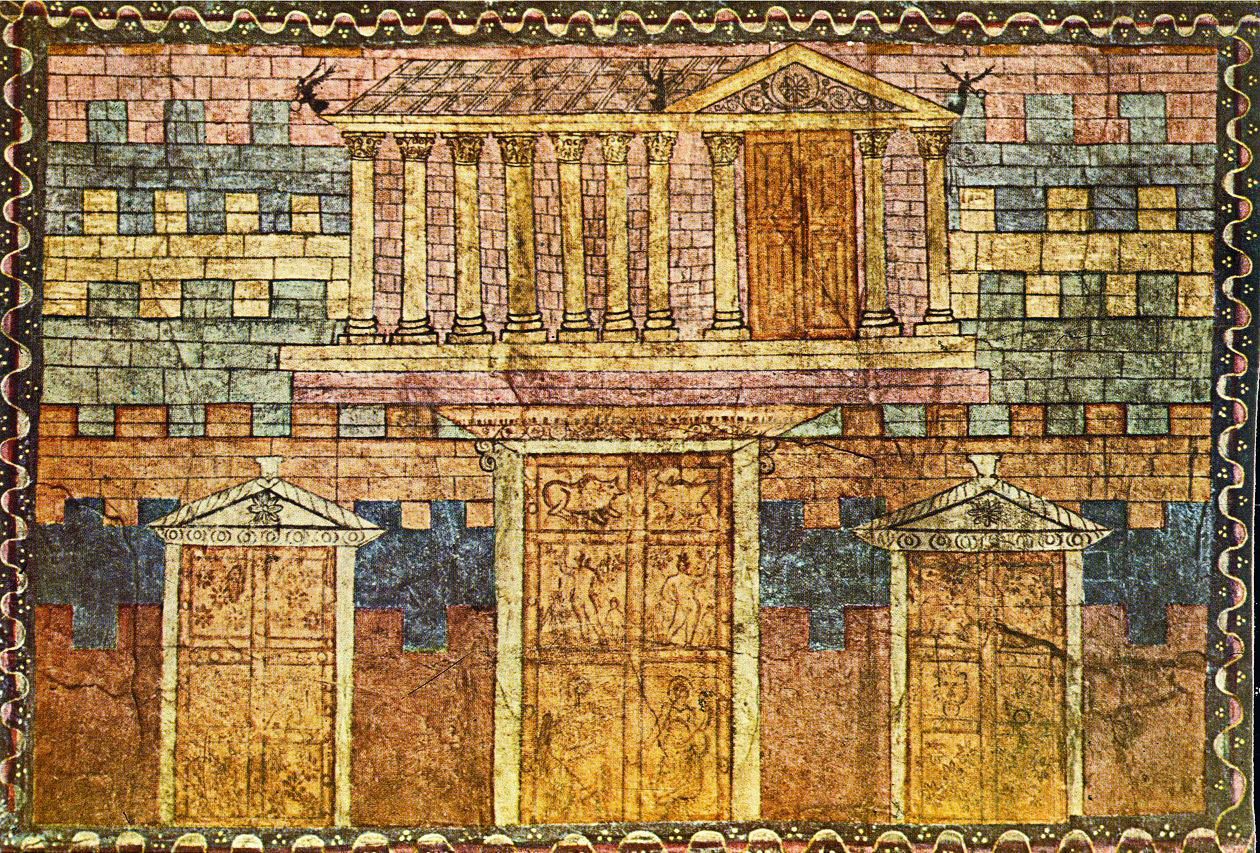
245–246 CE mural depicting the Temple of Solomon from the Dura Europos Synagogue

The description of Solomon's Temple given in I Kings and II Chronicles is remarkably detailed, but attempts to reconstruct it have met many difficulties. The description includes various technical terms that have lost their original meaning to time. Archaeological studies have provided ancient Near Eastern counterparts for architectural features, furnishings and decorative motifs. Contemporary Israeli archaeologist Finkelstein considered Solomon's Temple to be built according to Phoenician design, and its description is in accordance with how Phoenician temples looked; others have described the structure as temple in antis. In 2011, three small portable shrines were discovered in Khirbet Qeiyafa, an archaeological site 30 km (20 mi) from Jerusalem dated to 1025–975 BCE, a range that includes the biblical date for the reigns of David and Solomon. The smaller shrines are boxes shaped with different decorations showing impressive architectonic and decorative styles. One of the excavators, Israeli archaeologist Yosef Garfinkel, suggested that the style and the decoration of these cultic objects are very similar to the biblical description of some features of Solomon's Temple.

Archeologists categorize the biblical description of Solomon's Temple as a langbau building. That is, a rectangular building that is longer than it is wide. It is furthermore classified as a tripartite building, consisting of three units; the ulam (porch), the heikal (sanctuary), and the debir (the Holy of Holies). It is also categorized as being a straight-axis temple, meaning that there is a straight line from the entrance to the innermost shrine.

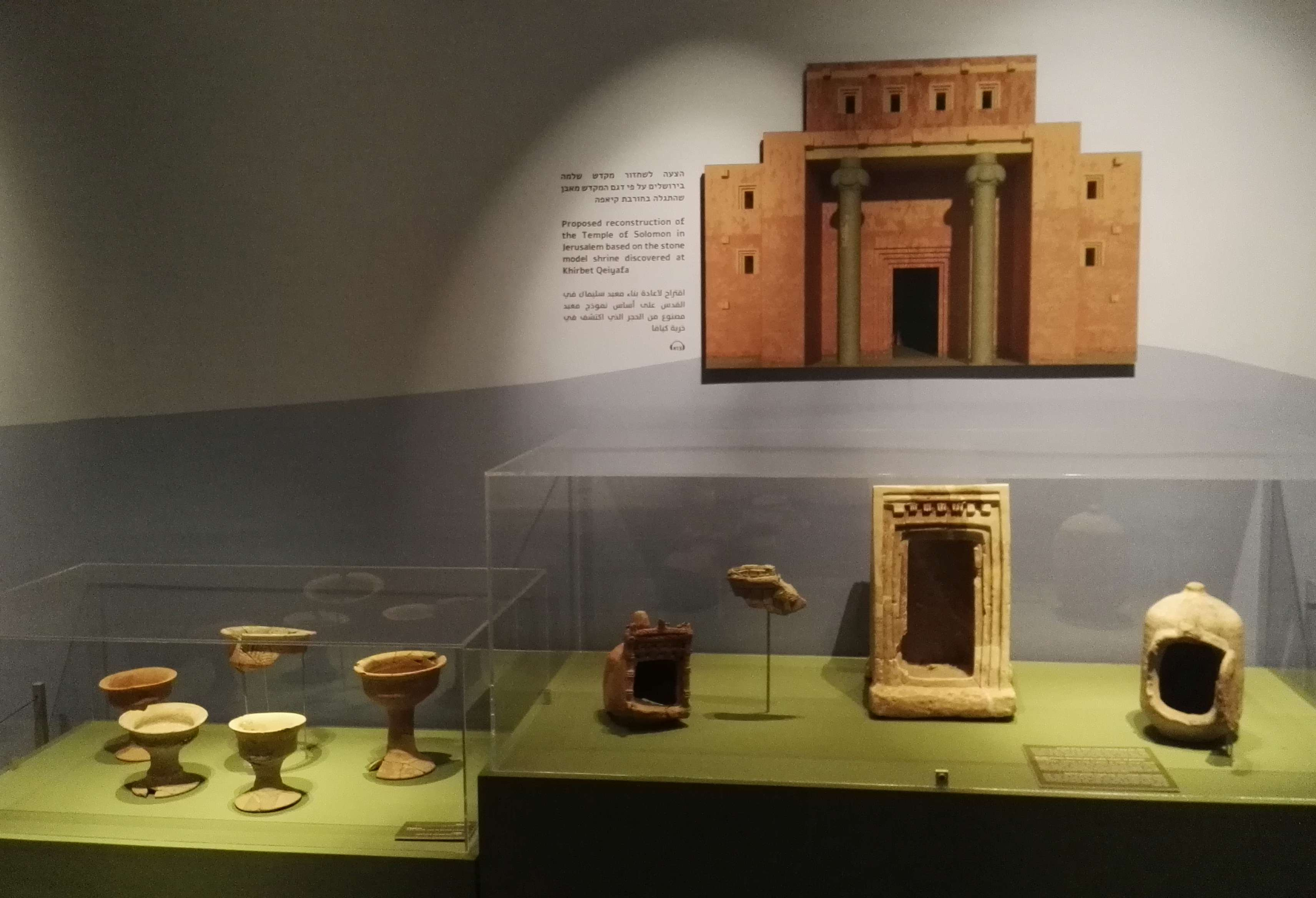
Proposed reconstruction of Solomon's Temple (2013) at Bible Lands Museum, based on 10th century BCE shrine model discovered in Khirbet Qeiyafa

=== Porch ===
The ulam, or porch, featured two bronze pillars, Boaz and Jachin. It is unclear from the biblical descriptions whether the porch was a closed room, a roofed entranceway, or an open courtyard. Thus, it is not known whether the pillars were freestanding or structural elements built into the porch. If they were built into the porch, it could indicate that the design was influenced by similar temples in Syria or even Turkey, home to the ancient Hittite Empire. While most reconstructions of the Temple have the pillars freestanding, Yosef Garfinkel and Madeleine Mumcuoglu finds it likely that the pillars supported a roof over the porch.

=== Sanctuary (main chamber) ===
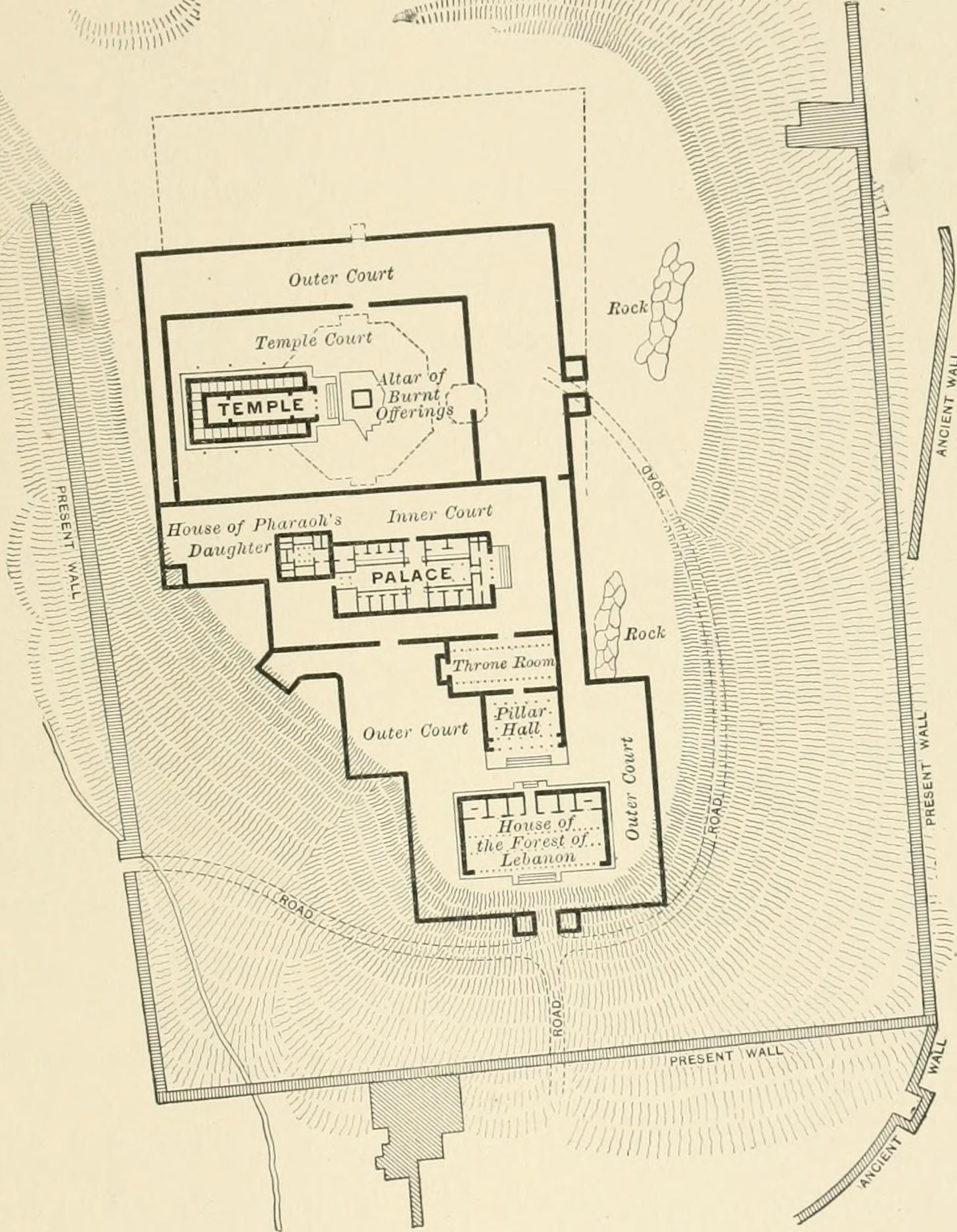
Plan of Solomon's Temple, published 1905

The porch led to the heikal, main chamber, or sanctuary. It measured 40 cubits in length, 20 cubits in width, and 30 cubits in height and contained a candelabrum, a table and a gold-covered altar used for offerings. In the sanctuary, loaves of Showbread were left as an offering to God. At the far end of the sanctuary there was a wooden door, guarded by two cherubim, leading to the Holy of Holies.

The walls of the sanctuary were lined with cedar, on which were carved figures of cherubim, palm trees, and open flowers that were overlaid with gold (1 Kings 6:29–30). Chains of gold further marked it off from the Holy of Holies. The floor of the Temple was of fir overlaid with gold. The doorposts, of olivewood, supported folding doors of fir. The doors of the Holy of Holies were of olivewood. On both sets of doors were carved cherubim, palm trees, and flowers, all being overlaid with gold (1 Kings 6:15 et seq.) This main building was between the outer altar, where most sacrifices were performed, and inside at the far end was the entry to the Holy of Holies, originally containing the Ark of the Covenant. The main hekhal contained a number of sacred ritual objects including the seven-branched candlestick, a golden Altar of Incense, and the table of the showbread. According to 1 Kings 7:48 these tables were of gold, as were also the five candlesticks on each side of the altar. The candle–tongs, basins, snuffers, firepans, and even the hinges of the doors were also gold.

=== Holy of Holies ===
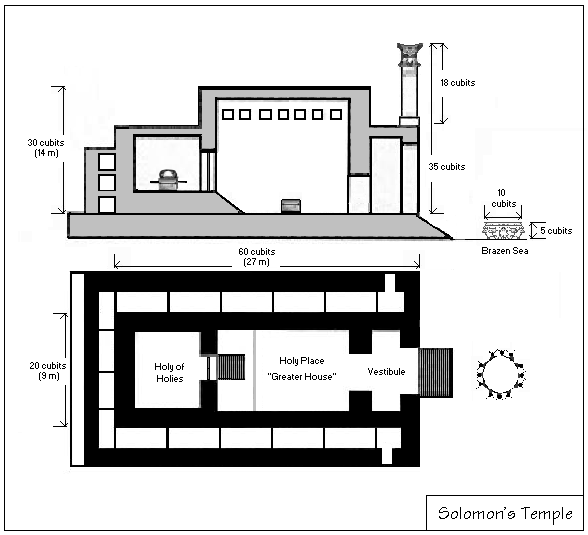
Plan of Solomon's Temple with measurements

The Holy of Holies, also called the "Inner House", was 20 cubits in length, breadth, and height. The usual explanation for the discrepancy between its height and the 30-cubit height of the temple is that its floor was elevated, like the cella of other ancient temples. It was floored and wainscotted with cedar of Lebanon, and its walls and floor were overlaid with gold amounting to 600 talents or roughly 20 metric tons. It contained two cherubim of olivewood, each 10 cubits high and each having outspread wings of 10 cubits span, so that, since they stood side by side, the wings touched the wall on either side and met in the center of the room. There was a two-leaved door between it and the Holy Place overlaid with gold; also, a veil of tekhelet (blue), purple, and crimson and fine linen. It had no windows and was considered the dwelling-place of the "name" of God.

The Holy of Holies was prepared to receive and house the Ark; and when the Temple was dedicated, the Ark, containing the original tablets of the Ten Commandments, was placed beneath the cherubim.

=== Surrounding chambers ===
Chambers were built around the Temple on the southern, western and northern sides (1 Kings 6:5–10). These formed a part of the building and were used for storage. They were probably one story high at first; two more may have been added later.

=== Courts ===
According to the Bible, two courts surrounded the Temple. The Inner Court (1 Kings 6:36), or Court of the Priests (2 Chr. 4:9), was separated from the space beyond by a wall of three courses of hewn stone, surmounted by cedar beams (1 Kings 6:36). It contained the Altar of burnt-offering (2 Chr. 15:8), the Brazen Sea laver (4:2–5, 10) and ten other lavers (1 Kings 7:38, 39). A brazen altar stood before the Temple (2 Kings 16:14), its dimensions 20 cubits square and 10 cubits high (2 Chr. 4:1). The Great Court surrounded the whole Temple (2 Chr. 4:9). It was here that people assembled to worship. (Jeremiah 19:14; 26:2).

=== Molten Sea ===
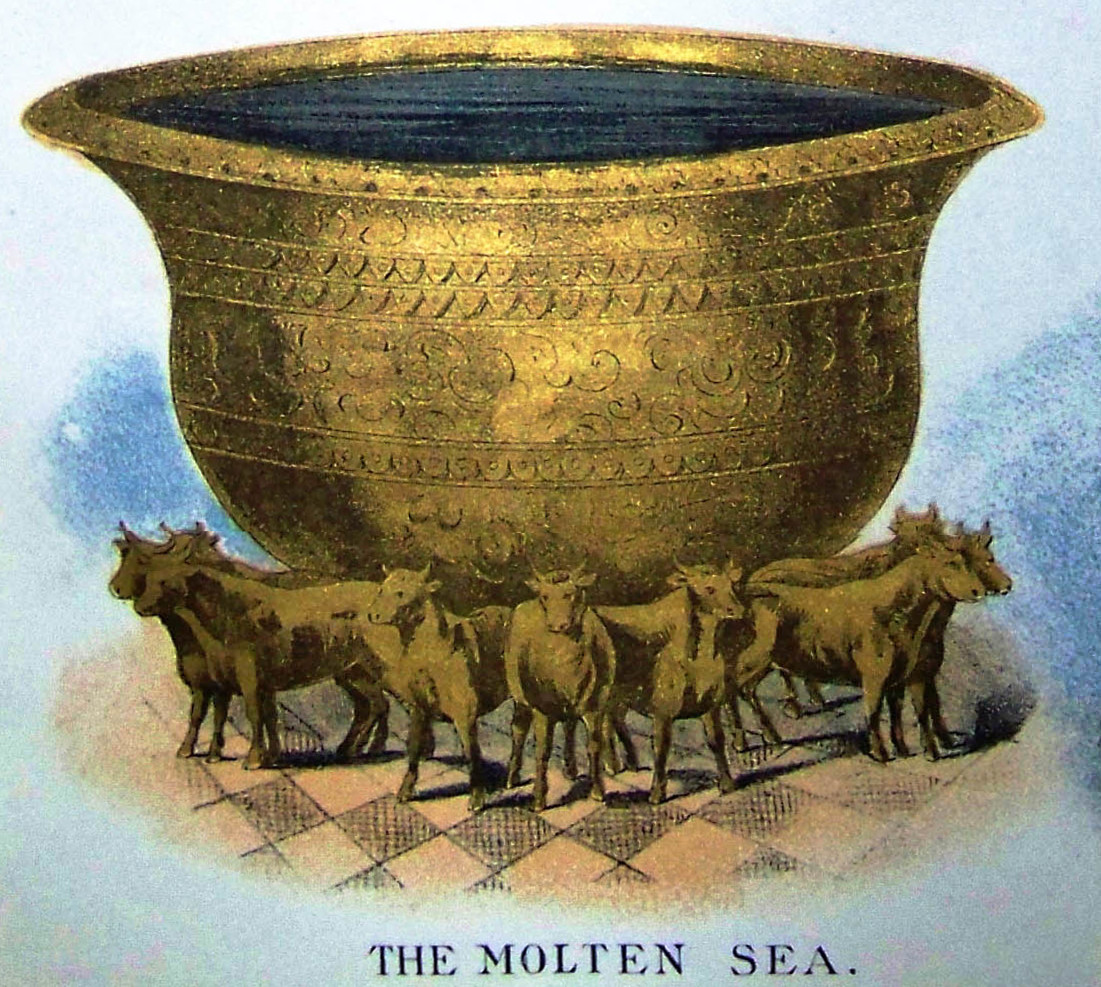
Molten Sea, illustration in the Holman Bible, 1890

According to the Hebrew Bible, the "Molten or Brazen Sea" (ים מוצק "cast metal sea") was a large basin in the Temple for ablution of the priests. It is described in 1 Kings 7:23–26 and 2 Chronicles 4:2–5.

According to the Bible, it stood in the south-eastern corner of the inner court. It was five cubits high, ten cubits in diameter from brim to brim, and thirty cubits in circumference. The brim was "like the calyx of a lily" and turned outward "about an hand breadth"; or about four inches. It was placed on the backs of twelve oxen, standing with their faces outward.

The Book of Kings states that it contains 2000 baths (90 cubic meters), while Chronicles (2 Chr. 4:5–6) states it can hold up to 3000 baths (136 cubic meters) and states that its purpose was to afford opportunity for the purification by immersion of the bodies of the priests. The fact that it was a washbasin that was too large to enter from above lends to the idea that water would likely have flowed from it down into a subcontainer beneath.

The water was originally supplied by the Gibeonites but was afterwards brought by a conduit from Solomon's Pools. The molten sea was made of brass or bronze that which Solomon had taken from the captured cities of Hadadezer ben Rehob, king of Zobah (1 Chronicles 18:8). Ahaz later removed this laver from the oxen and placed it on a stone pavement (2 Kings 16:17). It was destroyed by the Neo-Babylonian Empire (2 Kings 25:13).

Also outside the temple were 10 lavers, each of which held "forty baths" (1 Kings 7:38), resting on portable holders made of bronze, provided with wheels, and ornamented with figures of lions, cherubim, and palm-trees. The author of the books of the Kings describes their minute details with great interest (1 Kings 7:27–37). Josephus reported that the vessels in the Temple were composed of orichalcum covered in gold in Antiquities of the Jews.

Many have built models of the Temple. A few can be seen here.

== Worship ==
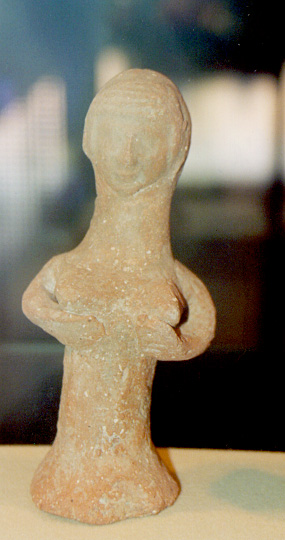
Asherah was worshipped until King Josiah. Figurine, 8th–6th century BCE.

During the United Monarchy, the Temple was dedicated to Yahweh, the God of Israel. There were daily services run by the priests and Levites and sacrifices were brought on a regular basis. The works performed in the Temple are described at length in the Bible, particularly in Leviticus, and in Seder Moed of the Mishnah and the Babylonian Talmud.

During the long reign of King Manasseh of Judah who ruled from 697 BCE until 643 BCE (the first twelve of which were ruled jointly with his father Hezekiah), pagan gods and rites invaded the temple. (2 Kings 21:1-6) This included Baal and the Caananite goddess Asherah (2 Kings 23:6) were worshipped in the Temple.

Priestesses wove ritual textiles for her (2 Kings 23:7). Next to the temple was a house for the temple prostitutes (2 Kings 23:7) who performed sacred prostitution at the temple. It is unclear whether the prostitutes included both male and female or just male prostitutes.

According to the majority of biblical scholars, Asherah was Yahweh's consort, and she was worshipped alongside Yahweh. This is disputed by a significant minority, who maintain that the asherah in the Temple was a wooden pole, rather than a statue. Although originally a symbol of the goddess, the asherah is argued to have been adopted as a symbol of Yahweh. According to Richard Lowery, Yahweh and Asherah headed a pantheon of other Judean gods that were worshipped at the temple.

The temple had chariots of the sun (2 Kings 23:11) and Ezekiel describes a vision of temple worshipers facing east and bowing to the sun (Ezekiel 8:16). Some Bible scholars, such as Margaret Barker, say that these solar elements indicate a solar cult. They may reflect an earlier Jebusite worship of Zedek or possibly a solarized Yahwism.

According to the Tanakh, the Temple housed the Ark of the Covenant. It says the Ark contained the Ten Commandments and was moved from Kiriath Jearim to Jerusalem by David before being moved into Solomon's temple. A common view among scholars is that the Ark was originally conceived as Yahweh's footstool, above which he was invisibly enthroned. Biblical scholar Francesca Stavrakopoulou states that Yahweh was physically enthroned above the Ark as a cult statue and it was only following the Exile that Yahweh was conceived as unseen and the prohibition on carved images was added to the Ten Commandments. On the other hand, some biblical scholars believe the story of the Ark was written independently and then incorporated into the main biblical narrative just before the exile into Babylon. Biblical scholar Thomas Römer speculates that the Ark may have contained statues of Yahweh and Asherah, and that it could have remained in Kiriath Jearim for much longer, possibly until shortly before the Babylonian conquest.

During the Deuteronomic reform of King Josiah, Menasseh's grandson, the cult objects of the sun and Asherah were taken out of the temple and the practice of sacred prostitution, and the worship of Baal and the hosts of heaven were stopped.

=== Sacrifice ===
One of the key activities at the Temple was the bringing of sacrifices. There were many different types for various reasons, which are detailed in the Bible, primarily in the Book of Leviticus and in the 11 tractates of Seder Kodashim of the Talmud. People were encouraged to come to the Temple three times a year during the holidays of Sukkot ( Feast of Tabernacles), Pesach ( Passover) and Shavuot ( Festival of Weeks) and bring sacrifices. A korban was a kosher animal sacrifice, such as a bull, sheep, goat, or dove that underwent shechita (Jewish ritual slaughter). Sacrifices could also consist of grain, meal, wine, or incense. Offerings were often cooked and most of it eaten by the offeror, with parts given to the Kohen priests and small parts burned on the altar of the Temple in Jerusalem. Only in special cases was all of the offering given only to God, such as in the case of the scapegoat. Under Josiah, sacrifices were centralized at Solomon's temple and other places of sacrifice were abolished. The temple became a major slaughtering center and part of Jerusalem's economy.

== Archaeological dating ==
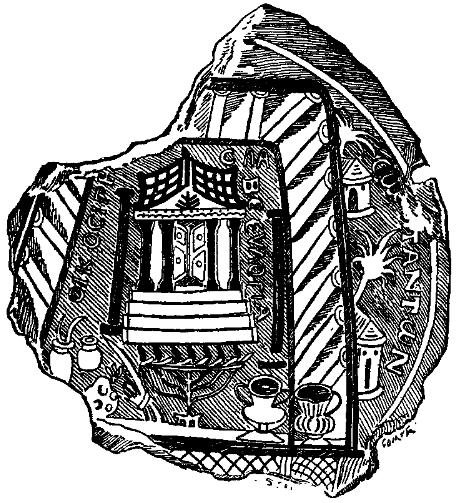
3rd century depiction of the temple on glass bowl, with Boaz and Jachin

Most scholars today agree that a temple had existed on the Temple Mount by the time of the Babylonian siege of Jerusalem (587 BCE), but the identity of its builder and its construction date are strongly debated. Because of the religious and political sensitivities involved, no archaeological excavations and only limited surface surveys of the Temple Mount have been conducted since Charles Warren's expedition of 1867–1870. As of today, there is no solid archaeological evidence for the existence of Solomon's Temple, and the building is not mentioned in surviving extra-biblical accounts, save for perhaps a single fragmented ostracon that mentions a "house of Yahweh" without any further specification. Artifacts previously believed to prove the existence of Solomon's Temple—an ivory pomegranate and a ninth century BCE stone tablet—are now highly contested as to their authenticity. Moreover, starting in the 1980s, biblical minimalists have doubted King Solomon's connection to the temple, sometimes describing him as little more than a hill country chieftain.

On the other hand, William G. Dever argues that the biblical description of the Temple itself shows profound similarities with other temples of the time (Phoenician, Assyrian and Philistine), suggesting that this cult structure was actually built by Solomon (whom he sees as an actual king of Israel) in the 10th century BCE, although the biblical description is undoubtedly excessive. These views are shared by the archaeologist Amihai Mazar, who underlines how the description of the Temple in the Bible, albeit exaggerated, is substantially in line with the architectural descriptions already present in the Levant in the second millennium BCE. Yosef Garfinkel and Madeleine Mumcuoglu argue that the discovery of a 9th century BCE temple at Motza, a secondary administrative site in the Kingdom of Judah, implies that there must have been a central temple in the kingdom’s capital.

Fabio Porzia and Corinne Bonnet, reflecting on the archaeological parallels between the way Solomon's temple is described and comparable examples of similar temples from around the ancient Near East, demur and conclude that "a gap [...] exists between the biblical accounts which place the temple in the 10th century and the historical considerations which tend towards the 8th and 7th centuries." They suggest that Solomon's temple corresponds more with the 8th-7th century temple architectural models associated with Aram or Assyria than with anything associated with temple architecture from the 10th century. They suggest that the first temple most likely dates to the 8th century and "was retroactively attributed to the great ruler of the 10th century."

In 2026, archaeologists discovered burned wooden beams probably destroyed during the Babylonian invasion of Jerusalem when the temple was traditionally destroyed. "Archaeologists believe the timbers formed part of the roof over an inner courtyard. When fire swept through the building, the roof collapsed onto the floor," Archaeology News reported.

=== Source materials ===
An ostracon (excavated prior to 1981), sometimes referred to as the House of Yahweh ostracon, was discovered at Tel Arad, dated to the 6th century BCE, which mentions a temple that could be the Temple in Jerusalem. This has been challenged by Fabio Porzia and Corinne Bonnet who wrote that the context and location of the temple mentioned is not known.

A thumb-sized ivory pomegranate (which came to light in 1979) measuring 44 millimetres (1.7 in) in height and bearing an ancient Hebrew inscription "Sacred donation for the priests in the House of ---h,]", was believed to have adorned a sceptre used by the high priest in Solomon's Temple. It was considered the most important item of biblical antiquities in the Israel Museum's collection. In 2004, however, experts from the Israel Museum reported the inscription to be a forgery, though the ivory pomegranate itself was dated to the 14th or 13th century BCE. This was based on the report's claim that three incised letters in the inscription stopped short of an ancient break, as they would have if carved after the ancient break was made. Since then, it has been proven that one of the letters was indeed carved prior to the ancient break, and the status of the other two letters are in question. Some paleographers and others have continued to insist that the inscription is ancient, some dispute this, so the authenticity of this writing is still the object of discussion. Another artifact, the Jehoash Inscription, which first came to notice in 2003, contains a 15-line description of King Jehoash's ninth-century BCE restoration of the Temple. Its authenticity was called into question by a report by the Israel Antiquities Authority, which said that the surface patina contained microfossils of foraminifera. As these fossils do not dissolve in water, they cannot occur in a calcium carbonate patina, leading initial investigators to conclude that the patina must be an artificial chemical mix applied to the stone by forgers. As of late 2012, the academic community is split on whether the tablet is authentic or not. Commenting on a 2012 report by geologists arguing for the authenticity of the inscription, in October 2012, Hershel Shanks (who believes the inscription is genuine) wrote the current situation was that most Hebrew language scholars believe that the inscription is a forgery and geologists that it is genuine, and thus "Because we rely on experts, and because there is an apparently irresolvable conflict of experts in this case, BAR has taken no position with respect to the authenticity of the Jehoash Inscription."

The historian Flavius Josephus, writing centuries later in 1st century CE, says that "Solomon began to build the temple in the fourth year of his reign, on the second month, which the Macedonians call Artemisius, and the Hebrews Jar, five hundred and ninety two years after the exodus out of Egypt, but after one thousand and twenty years from Abraham's coming out of Mesopotamia into Canaan and after the deluge one thousand four hundred and forty years; and from Adam, the first man who was created, until Solomon built the temple, there had past in all three thousand one hundred and two years."

In Against Apion, Josephus mentions that according to the annals of the Phoenician city-state of Tyre, Solomon's Temple was built on the 12th year of Hiram I of Tyre and 143 years and 8 months before the Tyrians founded Carthage. The foundation date of Carthage is usually dated to 814 BCE, thus, according to Josephus, the construction of the Temple should be dated to circa 958/9 BCE, a date that lies within the conventional dates of Solomon's reign between 970 and 931 BCE.

=== Temple Mount Sifting Project ===
The Temple Mount Sifting Project was established to recover archaeological artifacts from soil removed in 1999 by the Jerusalem Waqf from the Temple Mount. They have continuously been finding artifacts dating from the 8th to 7th centuries BCE, among them pottery and coins, stone weights for weighing silver and a First Temple period bulla, or seal impression.

=== Objects found next to the Temple Mount ===
In 2018 and a few years previously, two First Temple period stone weights used for weighing half-shekel Temple donations were found during excavations under Robinson's Arch at the foot of the Temple Mount. The tiny artifacts, inscribed with the word beka, which is known from related contexts in the Hebrew Bible, were used to weigh silver pieces on a scale, possibly at the very spot where they were unearthed.

=== Other ===
- Leen Ritmeyer has suggested that one of the steps leading to the Dome of the Rock is actually the top of a remaining stone course of the western wall of the pre-Herodian Temple Mount platform, which may be dated to the First Temple period.
- In 2007, artifacts dating to the 8th to 6th centuries BCE were described as being possibly the first physical evidence of human activity at the Temple Mount during the First Temple period. The findings included animal bones, juglet and ceramic bowl fragments, as well as the rim of a storage jar.

== In Islam ==
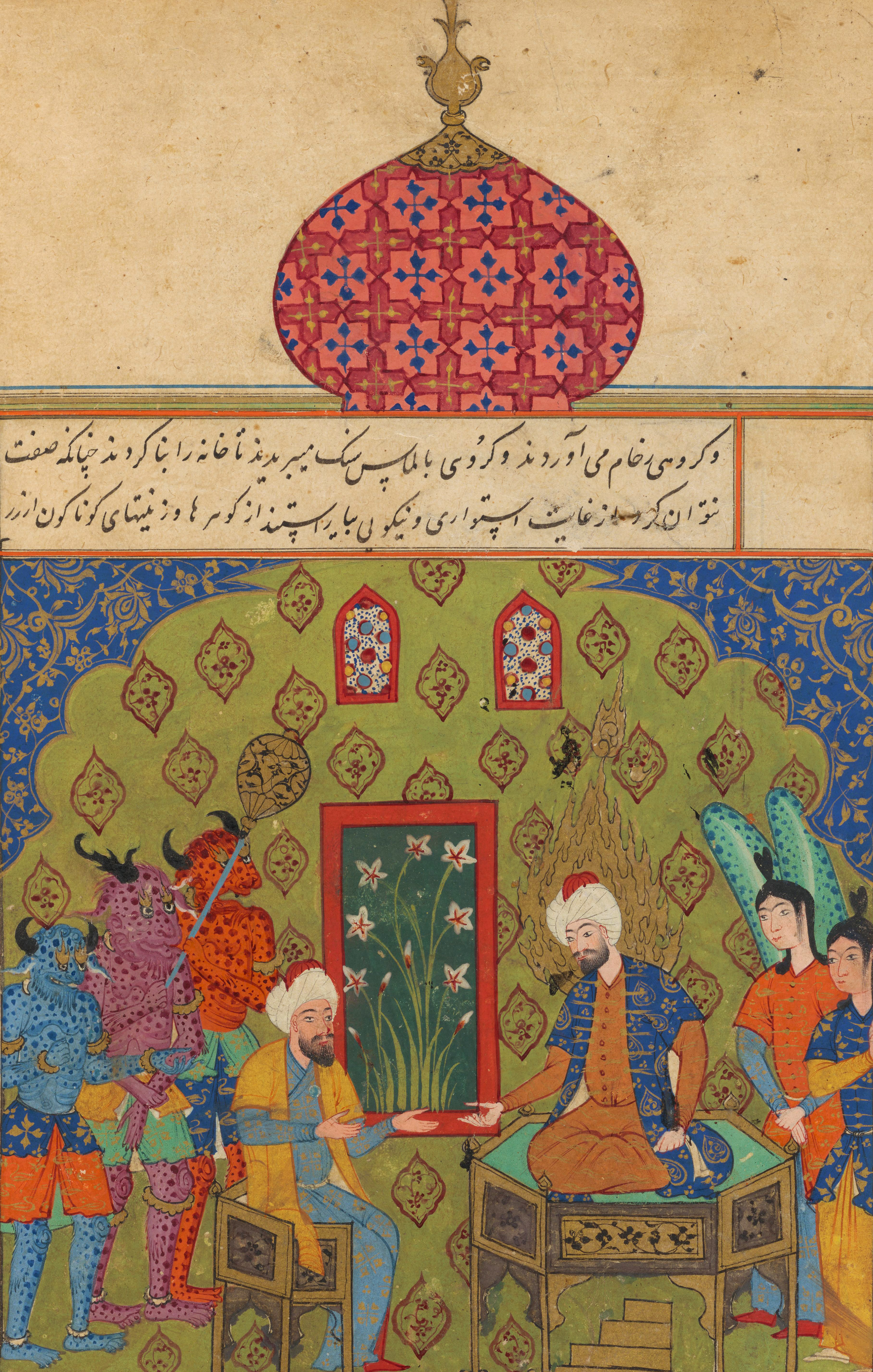
Islamic depiction of Sulayman talking with his architect, discussing the construction of his temple. He is served by divs/jinn and angels in his endeavour.

The Quran refers to Solomon's Temple in the seventh verse of Surah Al-Isrāʾ (The Night Journey, aka Bani Israil):

If you [the Children of Israel] act rightly, it is for your own good, but if you do wrong, it is to your own loss. And when the second warning would come to pass, your enemies would ˹be left to˺ totally disgrace you and enter the Temple ˹of Jerusalem˺ as they entered it the first time, and utterly destroy whatever would fall into their hands.

Quranic commentators such as Muhammad al-Tahir ibn Ashur have postulated that this verse refers specifically to the Temple of Solomon.

According to the narrative in Islam, the Temple in Jerusalem was originally a mosque commissioned by Solomon and built by jinn on the commandment of Allah, with the purpose of serving as the qibla of the Israelites. In the early years of Islam, Prophet Muhammad and his followers faced Jerusalem for prayers until the city of Mecca (specifically its Kaaba) superseded the former as the new qibla.

== Legacy ==
=== Freemasonry ===
Rituals in Freemasonry refer to King Solomon and the building of his Temple. Masonic buildings, where lodges and their members meet, are sometimes called "temples"; an allegoric reference to King Solomon's Temple.

=== Kabbalah ===
Kabbalah views the design of the Temple of Solomon as representative of the metaphysical world and the descending light of the creator through Sefirot of the Tree of Life. The levels of the outer, inner and priest's courts represent three lower worlds of Kabbalah. The Boaz and Jachin pillars at the entrance of the temple represent the active and passive elements of the world of Atziluth. The original menorah and its seven branches represent the seven lower Sephirot of the Tree of Life. The veil of the Holy of Holies and the inner part of the temple represent the Veil of the Abyss on the Tree of Life, behind which the Shekhinah or Divine Presence hovers.

=== Architecture ===
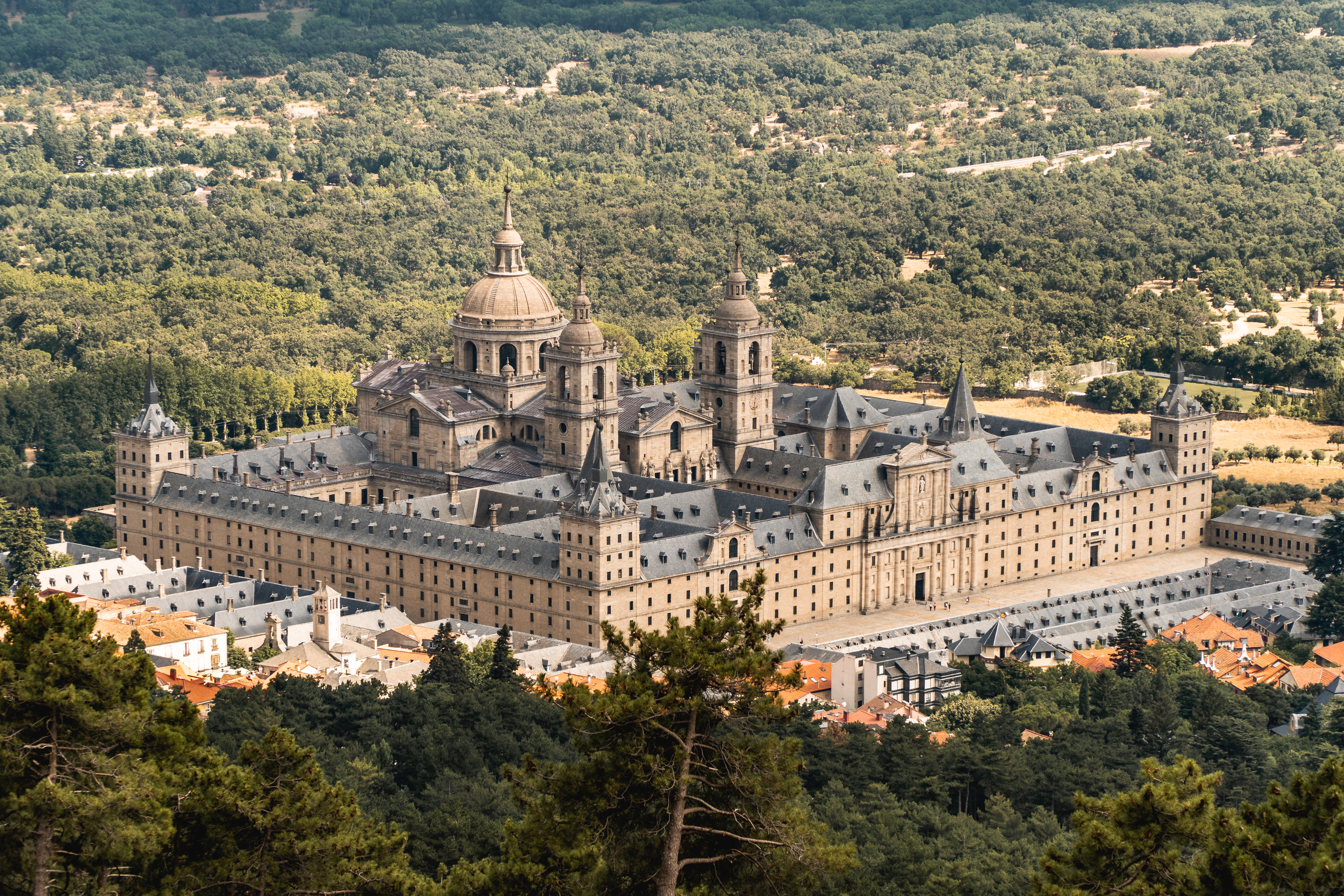
El Escorial was designed to emulate Solomon's Temple.

Biblical descriptions of the temple have inspired modern replicas and influenced later structures around the world. El Escorial, a historical residence of the King of Spain built in the 16th century was constructed from a plan based on the descriptions of Solomon's temple.

The same architectural layout of the temple was adopted in synagogues leading to the hekhal being applied in Sephardi usage to the Ashkenazi Torah ark, the equivalent of the nave.

=== Popular culture ===
Solomon's Temple appears in the film Solomon and Sheba (1959). It also appears in the Assassin's Creed video game series.

== Other contemporary temples ==
There is archaeological and written evidence of three Israelite temples, either contemporary or of very close date, dedicated to Yahweh (Elephantine temple, probably Arad too), either in the Land of Israel or in Egypt. Two of them have the same general outline as given by the Bible for the Jerusalem Temple.

- The Israelite temple at Tel Arad in Judah, 10th to 8th/7th century BCE and possibly dedicated to Yahweh and Asherah.
- The Jewish temple at Elephantine in Egypt, already standing in 525 BCE
- The Israelite temple at Tel Motza, c. 750 BCE discovered in 2012 a few kilometres west of Jerusalem.
- Several Iron Age temples have been found in the region that have striking similarities to the Temple of King Solomon. In particular the Ain Dara temple in northern Syria with a similar age, size, plan and decorations.

== See also ==
=== General ===
- Aish tamid, eternal flame on Temple altar
- List of Jewish Temples
- Solomonic column, spiraling column
- Solomon's shamir, worm or a substance that had the power to cut through or disintegrate stone, iron and diamond
- Temple denial

=== Persons ===
- Isaiah
- Jeremiah
- Hezekiah
- Yosef Elboim
- Zadok

=== Places ===
- City of David
- Mount Moriah
- Old St. Peter's Basilica
- Siloam tunnel
- Siloam inscription
- Elephantine Temple
- Leontopolis Temple
- Samaritan Temple

=== Iron Age temples from the region ===
- 'Ain Dara temple
- Ebla (Temple D)
- Emar temple
- Mumbaqat temple
- Tell Tayinat temple (8th century BCE)

== Notes and references ==
=== Sources ===
==== Books ====
- Alter, Robert (2018). The Hebrew Bible: A Translation with Commentary (Vol. Three-Volume Set). W. W. Norton. pp. 1087–. ISBN 978-0-393-29250-3.
- Boardman, John; Edwards, I. E. S.; Sollberger, E. (1992). The Cambridge Ancient History. Cambridge University Press. pp. 400–. ISBN 978-0-521-22717-9.
- Brand, Chad; Mitchell, Eric (2015). Holman Illustrated Bible Dictionary. B&H Publishing Group. pp. 622–. ISBN 978-0-8054-9935-3.
- De Vaux, Roland (1961). John McHugh (ed.). Ancient Israel: Its Life and Institutions. NY: McGraw-Hill.
- Dever, William G. (2005). Did God Have a Wife?: Archaeology and Folk Religion in Ancient Israel. Wm. B. Eerdmans. ISBN 978-0-8028-2852-1.
- Dever, William G. (2001). What Did the Biblical Writers Know and When Did They Know It?: What Archeology Can Tell Us About the Reality of Ancient Israel. Wm. B. Eerdmans Publishing. ISBN 978-0-8028-2126-3.
- Finkelstein, Israel; Silberman, Neil Asher (2002). The Bible Unearthed: Archaeology's New Vision of Ancient Israel and the Origin of Sacred Texts. Simon and Schuster. ISBN 978-0-7432-2338-6.
- Hackett, Jo Ann (2001). "'There Was No King In Israel': The Era of the Judges". In Coogan, Michael David (ed.). The Oxford History of the Biblical World. Oxford University Press. ISBN 978-0-19-513937-2.
- Kalimi, Isaac (2018). Writing and Rewriting the Story of Solomon in Ancient Israel. Cambridge University Press. ISBN 978-1-108-47126-8.
- King, Philip J.; Stager, Lawrence E. (2001). Life in Biblical Israel. Westminster John Knox Press. ISBN 978-0-664-22148-5.
- Lundquist, John M. (2008). The Temple of Jerusalem: Past, Present, and Future. Greenwood Publishing Group. pp. 45–. ISBN 978-0-275-98339-0.
- Mendels, D. (1987). The Land of Israel as a Political Concept in Hasmonean Literature: Recourse to History in Second Century B.C. Claims to the Holy Land. Texte und Studien zum antiken Judentum. J.C.B. Mohr. ISBN 978-3-16-145147-8.
- Smith, Mark S. (2002). The Early History of God: Yahweh and the Other Deities in Ancient Israel (2nd ed.). Eerdmans. ISBN 978-0-8028-3972-5.
- Stavrakopoulou, Francesca (2021). God: An Anatomy. Picador. ISBN 978-1-5098-6734-9.
- Tetley, M. Christine (2005). The Reconstructed Chronology of the Divided Kingdom. Eisenbrauns. pp. 105–. ISBN 978-1-57506-072-9.
- Van Keulen, P. S. F. (2005). Two Versions Of The Solomon Narrative: An Inquiry Into The Relationship Between MT 1kgs. 2-11 And LXX 3 Reg. 2-11. Brill. pp. 183–. ISBN 90-04-13895-1.
- Wensinck, Arent Jan (1986). "Ḳibla: Ritual and Legal Aspects". In Bosworth, C. E.; van Donzel, E.; Lewis, B. & Pellat, Ch. (eds.). The Encyclopaedia of Islam, Second Edition. Volume V: Khe–Mahi. Leiden: E. J. Brill. pp. 82–83. ISBN 978-90-04-07819-2.

==== Journal articles ====
- Garfinkel, Yosef; Mumcuoglu, Madeleine (2019). "The Temple of Solomon in Iron Age Context". Religions. 10 (3): 198. doi:10.3390/rel10030198. ISSN 2077-1444.
- Schwarzer, Mitchell (1 December 2001). "The Architecture of Talmud". Journal of the Society of Architectural Historians. 60 (4): 474–487. doi:10.2307/991731. ISSN 0037-9808. JSTOR 991731. Archived from the original on 13 April 2021.

==== Other ====
- Draper, Robert (December 2010). "Kings of Controversy". National Geographic: 66–91. ISSN 0027-9358. Archived from the original on 7 February 2018.
- Finkelstein, Israel; Neil Asher Silberman (2006). David and Solomon: In Search of the Bible's Sacred Kings and the Roots of the Western Tradition. Free Press. ISBN 978-0-7432-4362-9.
- Glueck, Nelson (February 1944). "On the Trail of King Solomon's Mines". National Geographic. 85 (2): 233–56. ISSN 0027-9358.
- Goldman, Bernard (1966). The Sacred Portal: a primary symbol in ancient Judaic art. Detroit: Wayne State University Press. "It has a detailed account and treatment of Solomon's Temple and its significance."
- Hamblin, William; David Seely (2007). Solomon's Temple: Myth and History. Thames and Hudson. ISBN 978-0-500-25133-1.
- Hurowitz, Victor A. (2005). "YHWH's exalted house - Aspects of the design and symbolism of Solomon's temple". In Day, John (ed.). Temple and Worship in Biblical Israel. Library of Hebrew Bible/Old Testament studies. T&T Clark. pp. 63–110. ISBN 978-0-567-04262-0.
- Mazar, Benjamin (1975). The Mountain of the Lord. NY: Doubleday. ISBN 978-0-385-04843-9.
- Prokop, Daniel (2020). The Pillars of the First Temple (1 Kgs 7,15-22): A Study from Ancient Near Eastern, Biblical, Archaeological, and Iconographic Perspectives. Forschungen zum Alten Testament. Vol. 116. Mohr Siebeck. ISBN 978-3-16-159322-2.
- Young, Mike. "Temple Measurements and Photo recreations". Archived from the original on 7 August 2010.
- Stefon, Matt (30 April 2020). "Solomon". Encyclopedia Britannica. Archived from the original on 9 October 2023.
- "Holy of Holies". Encyclopedia Britannica. Archived from the original on 11 December 2020.
- "Temple of Jerusalem". Encyclopedia Britannica. 17 September 2020. Archived from the original on 20 October 2020.
- Pruitt, Sarah (10 January 2014). "Fate of the Lost Ark Revealed?". HISTORY. Archived from the original on 26 November 2020.
- Lovett, Richard A.; Hoffman, Scot (21 January 2017). "Ark of the Covenant". National Geographic. Archived from the original on 29 March 2020.
- Shabi, Rachel (20 January 2005). "Faking it". the Guardian.
