= Shamir (disambiguation) =

Shamir is a Hebrew surname.

Shamir may also refer to:

== Given name ==
- Shamir (biblical figure)
- Shamir (musician), American singer-songwriter Shamir, aka Shamir Bailey
- Shamir Fenelon, Irish footballer
- Shamir Khan, Indian cricketer
- Shamir Tandon, Indian composer and film director
- Shamir Thomas, Grenadian retired track and field athlete

== Other ==
- Solomon's shamir, a worm described in the Talmud and Midrash as being capable of cutting through or disintegrating stone, used in the construction of the First Temple in Jerusalem
- Shamir, Israel, an Israeli kibbutz
- Shamir, minor biblical place
- Shamir (album), studio album by Shamir (musician)
- Shamir Medical Center

== See also ==
- Shameer (disambiguation)
