= Samiri (disambiguation) =

Samiri is an Islamic religious figure.

Samiri may also refer to:

- Touria Samiri, a Moroccan track and field athlete
- Khaled Al-Samiri, a Saudi Arabian footballer

== See also ==
- Samir (disambiguation)
- Shameer (disambiguation)
