= Ivory pomegranate =

Bone ornamental object held in Jerusalem

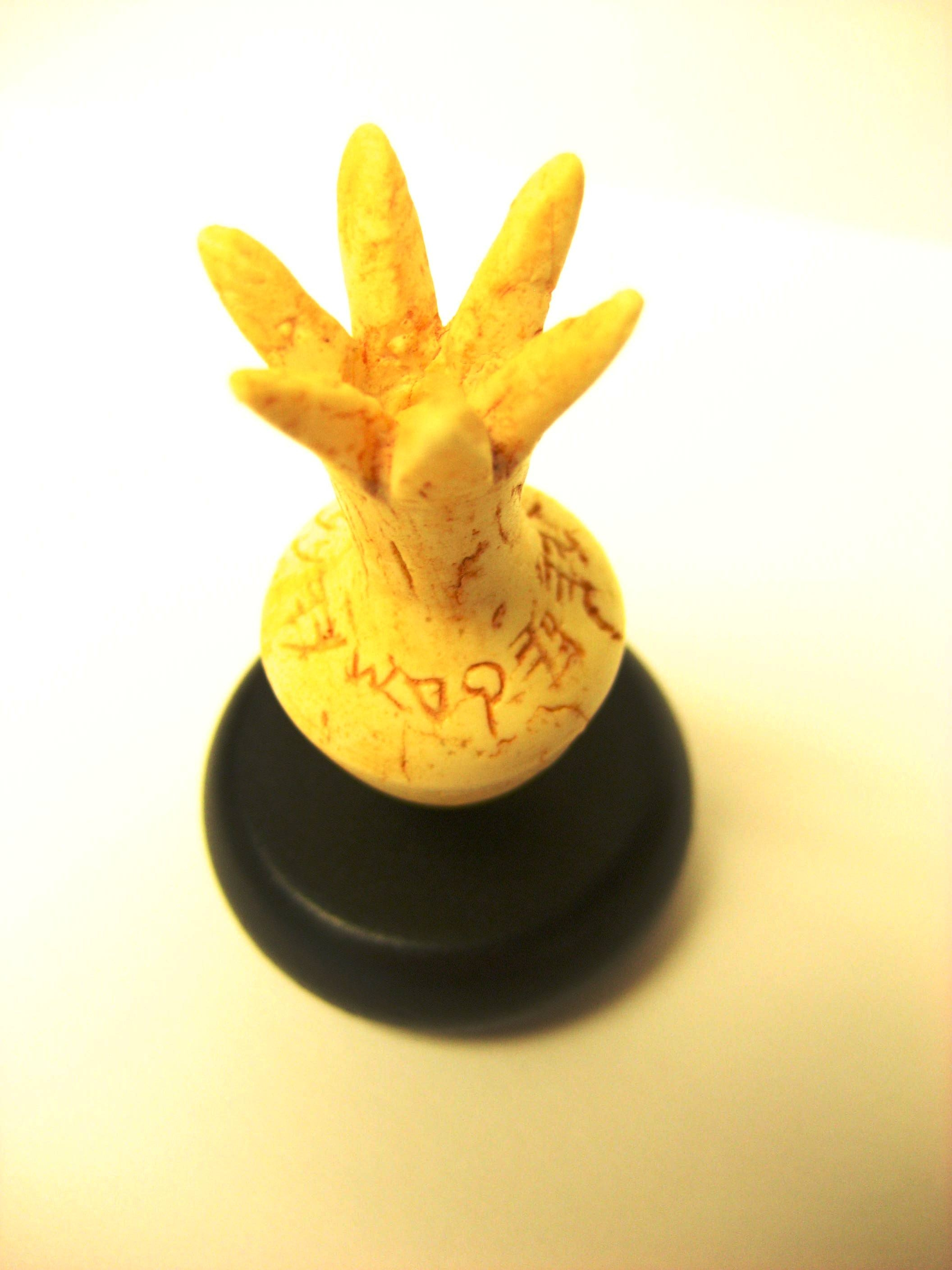
A photo of the reconstructed artifact

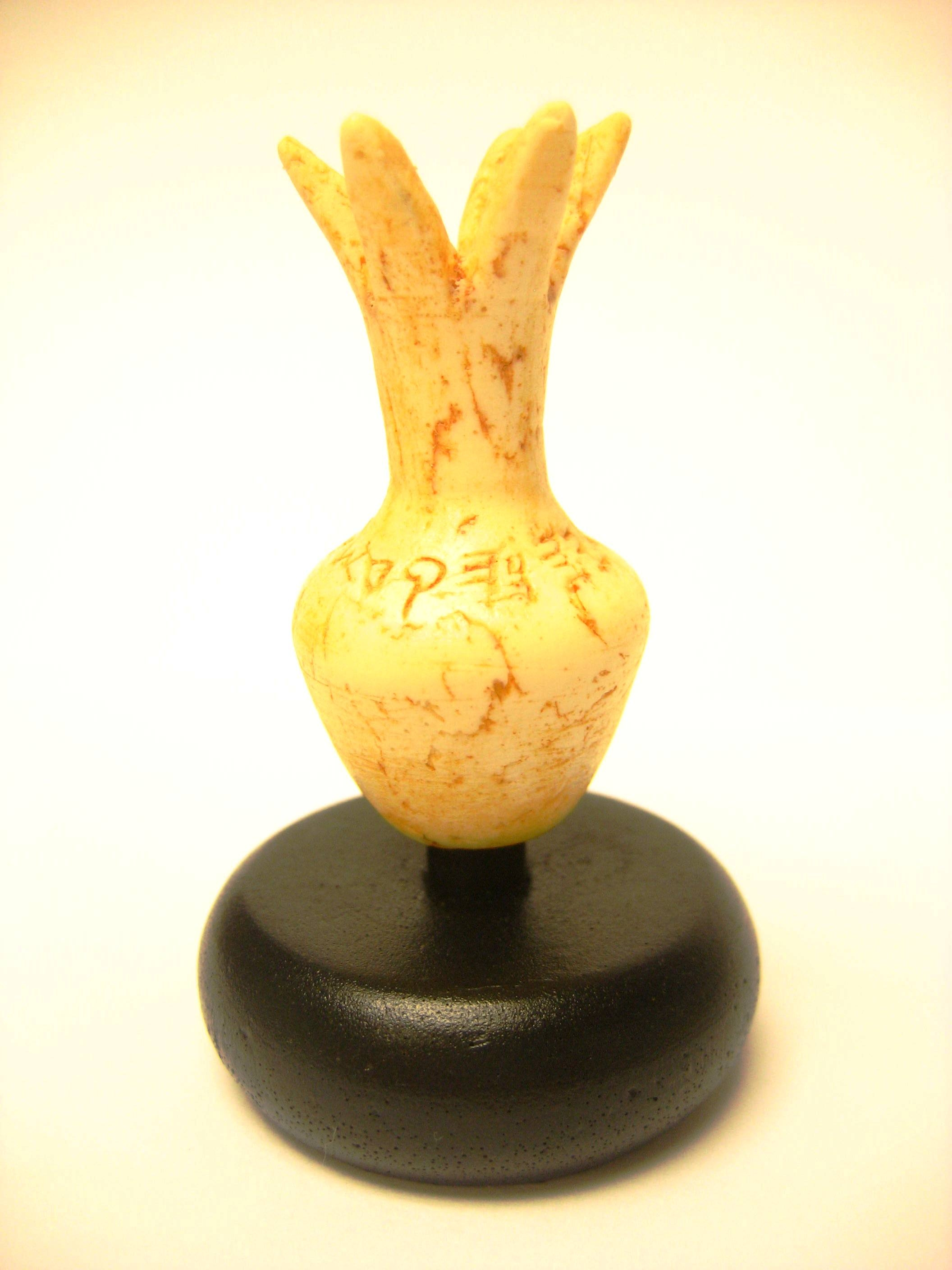
Lateral view

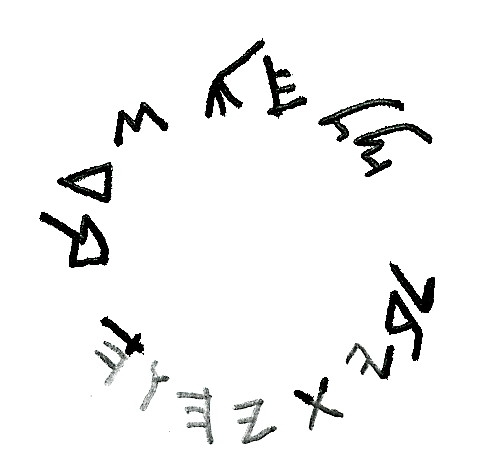
A drawing of the Paleo-Hebrew inscription with missing letters shown as faded

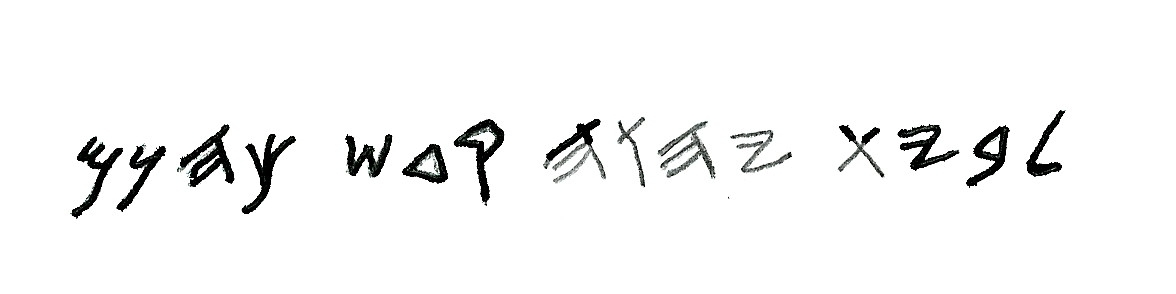
Paleo-Hebrew inscription from right to left

The ivory pomegranate or Jerusalem Pomegranate is a thumb-sized ornamental artifact acquired by the Israel Museum. It is not actually made of ivory, but of hippopotamus bone and bears an inscription; Holy (Sacred) to the Priest of the House of God (YHWH).

At the time of its discovery, it was thought to have adorned the High Priest's sceptre within the Holy of Holies, thus potentially proving the existence of Solomon's Temple. However, experts of the Israel Museum have declared the inscription to be a modern forgery, and that the item dates back to the 14th or the 13th century BCE, well before the time of Solomon.

== Text ==
Text	𐤋𐤁𐤉[𐤕𐤉𐤄𐤅]𐤄𐤒𐤃𐤔𐤊𐤄𐤍𐤌
Transliteration	lby[t yhw]h qdš khnm
Romanization	la-bey[t YHW]H qodesh kohanim
Translation	"Belonging to the Hou[se of Yahwe]h, holy to the priests"

== Description ==
The artifact is a small ornamental bone object engraved with a short inscription in paleo-Hebrew. The inscription is inscribed in circular fashion along the shoulders of the pomegranate which is the shape of the fruit in blossom stage. A significant part of the body of the pomegranate is broken including two breaks to the long petals of the fruit. There is a vertical break on the body that cuts through the inscription, so that three letters are fragmentary and nine complete. Two areas of this fracture are lighter shades and considered to be new breaks on top of the ancient break.

The pomegranate was popular as a cultic object and was not unique to the worship of Yahweh. Archaeologist Aharon Kempinski has argued that, even if the inscription is authentic, the chance of it belonging to Solomon's Temple is extremely small as its origin is unknown and there were many "houses of Yahweh" outside Jerusalem, many of which "have not yet been excavated but are constantly ransacked by [illegal] treasure seekers". Baruch Halpern has suggested another interpretation of the inscription.

The word "house" can also mean, literally, a house where a family lived. The missing letters could read (Ahijah) "[hyja]H". At least three of the Biblical Ahijahs were priests and the inscription may be a reference to a priestly family rather than a deity. Halpern also notes that the unusual syntax of the inscription makes this interpretation philologically possible.

Kempinski 1990 said the missing divine name should be reconstructed as Asherah, instead of Yahweh. A goddess connection is bolstered by other ancient pomegranates. Heltzer 1996 said the two examples were votives reading to/for Astarte.

== Authenticity ==
The thumb-sized ivory pomegranate measuring 44 millimetres (1.7 in) in height, bears an ancient Hebrew inscription that reads, depending on the point chosen as the beginning in the circular inscription, "Belonging to the Temple [literally 'house'] of YHWH, holy to the priests" or "Sacred donation for the priests of [or 'in'] the Temple [literally 'house'] of YHWH". It was once believed by some scholars to have adorned a sceptre used by the high priest in Solomon's Temple. Its origin is unknown as it appeared on the antiquities market anonymously in 1979 and was smuggled out of Israel and sold to an anonymous collector in France. Based on authentication by Israel's then leading epigrapher, Professor Nahman Avigad of Hebrew University, the Israel Museum in Jerusalem purchased it from the collector for the sum of $550,000 in 1988. It was considered the most important item of biblical antiquities in the Israel Museum's collection.

In 2004, the Investigative Committee of Israel alleged it was a part of an antiquities fraud and was involved with other suspected archaeological forgeries such as the Jehoash Inscription. This resulted in a major investigation by the committee which determined that the artifact dated back to the 14th or 13th century BCE and that the inscription was a modern forgery. Professor Aaron Demsky claims that there is an 80 percent certainty that the inscription is a forgery.

In 2004, Israeli police filed criminal indictments against Oded Golan, accusing him of forging biblical artifacts. This was the first time a criminal court had been asked to rule in a case of antiquities forgery. On March 14, 2012, Golan was acquitted of all charges of forgery after the judge found that police had failed to prove forgery beyond all reasonable doubt. Although the indictment alleged that the pomegranate inscription was a forgery, the judge did not consider its authenticity in his findings, as it was not included in the individual counts. Judge Aharon Farkash stated that the acquittal did not mean that the objects were "true and authentic".

In May 2007, three members of the original investigative committee re-examined the inscription to evaluate the counter-arguments of André Lemaire, who was invited to join them. Shmuel Ahituv, Aaron Demsky and Yuval Goren, while changing their minds on a few points, maintained that the inscription was a forgery, while Lemaire maintained that it was authentic.
