= Sameera =

Sameera may refer to:

- Sameera (film), a 1981 Hindi film
- Sameera (given name), or Samira, including a list of people with the name
- Nuwan Sameera (born 1985), Sri Lankan cricketer

== See also ==
- Sameer (disambiguation)
- Samir (disambiguation), a male name
