= Shamir =

Shamir (Hebrew: שמיר) is a Hebrew surname. Notable people with the surname include:

- Adi Shamir (born 1952), Israeli cryptographer
- Ariel Shamir, Israeli professor of Computer Science
- Carmela Shamir, Israeli ambassador
- Dan Shamir (born 1975), Israeli professional basketball coach
- Eden Shamir, Israeli professional footballer
- Eli Shamir, Israeli mathematician and computer scientist
- Gabriel and Maxim Shamir, Israeli graphic designers
- Israel Shamir, Russian-Israeli-Swedish writer
- Meir Shamir, Israeli businessman
- Meirav Shamir, Israeli-American footballer
- Milette Shamir, Israeli academic administrator and scholar of American literature
- Moshe Shamir, Israeli author, playwright, opinion writer, and public figure
- Nadine Shamir, American singer and musician
- Ron Shamir, Israeli professor of computer science
- Shlomo Shamir, third Commander of the Israeli Navy
- Shulamit Shamir, Israeli activist, wife of the seventh Prime Minister of Israel, Yitzhak Shamir
- Yair Shamir, Israeli politician
- Yitzhak Shamir, former Israeli Prime Minister
- Yoav Shamir, Israeli documentary filmmaker

it can also mean:

- Solomon's shamir

== See also ==
- Shameer (disambiguation)
