= Samīr (given name) =

Masculine given name

- Pronunciation: /sə.miːr/
- Gender: Male
- Language: Sanskrit, Hindi, etc.

Origin
- Language: Sanskrit
- Meaning: Breeze, Wind, Air, Vāyu
- Region of origin: India, South Asia

Other names
- Alternative spelling: Sameera

Samīr (also spelled Sameer or Samir) is a Sanskrit male given name. It originates from the Sanskrit word samīra which means "breeze", "wind", "air", "aura", or the wind deity Vāyu. Some, especially in South India, do not delete the schwa and use the name "Sameera". Notable people with the name include:

- Samir Soni
- Samir Kochhar
- Samir Roychoudhury
- Sameer Anjaan
- Sameer Verma
- Sameer Wankhede
- Sameer Dharmadhikari
- Sameer Gadhia
- Sameer Dattani
- Sammer Rajda

== See also ==
- Samir (disambiguation)
- Sameer (disambiguation)
- Samira/Samīra, an Arabic female given name and a Sanskrit male given name
