= Galafi–Nagad High Voltage Power Line =

High voltage power line in East Africa

Location
- Country: Ethiopia & Djibouti
- General direction: West to East
- From: Galafi, Djibouti (with extension to Samera, Ethiopia)
- To: Nagad, Djibouti

Ownership information
- Owner: Government of Djibouti & Government of Ethiopia
- Partners: African Development Bank & World Bank Group
- Operator: Ethiopian Electric Power Corporation & Electricité de Djibouti

Construction information
- Construction cost: US$75 million
- Commissioned: 2024 Expected

Technical information
- Type: Overhead Transmission Line
- Total length: 292 km (181 mi)
- DC voltage: 230 kV
- No. of circuits: 2

The Galafi–Nagad High Voltage Power Line, is a 230 kV double circuit high-voltage electricity power transmission line that is planned to connect the high voltage substation at Galafi, Djibouti to another high voltage substation at Nagad, Djibouti. The power project also involves the strengthening of the high voltage transmission line between Samera, Ethiopia and Galafi, Djibouti to augment that part of the Ethiopian grid and minimize the possibility of "isolation of the Djibouti national grid" and end of circuit issues in Nagad. This interconnection between the national grids of Ethiopia and Djibouti, is the second, the first one having been established in 2011.

== Location ==
The new construction of the new interstate electricity interconnector is between Galafi, Djibouti, at the border with Ethiopia to Nagad Djibouti, near the country's capital of Djibouti City, where no transmission line existed before this project. The road distance Between the two locations is approximately 190 kilometres (118 mi).

Due to technical issues with the interconnection, the transmission line from the substation at Semera, Ethiopia to the border town of Galafi, Djibouti, which existed before this project, needs to be strengthened to carry the new energy at 230kV and maintain stability of both grids in Ethiopia and Djibouti. This section of the transmission line measures approximately 102 kilometres (63 mi). The entire length of the power interconnector is quoted as 292 kilometres (181 mi), with approximately 102 kilometres (63 mi) located in Ethiopia and about 190 kilometres (118 mi) situated in Djibouti.

== Overview ==
This power line serves three major purposes. The first purpose is to enable Ethiopia and Djibouti to trade in surplus electricity between each other. At the start, Ethiopia has excess power, while Djibouti has a power deficit.

Djibouti has a small grid, compared to its neighbor, Ethiopia. The former's installed capacity of 123 megawatts, as of July 2021, is nearly all derived from expensive fossil sources with high tariffs that are stifling economic growth in the country. Sourcing power from Ethiopia's abundant renewable sources is expected to lower tariffs in Djibouti, increasing electricity consumption by businesses, industry and homes, thereby boosting the economy.

As of April 2021, Djibouti had a number of renewable energy projects in the pipeline, including wind, solar and geothermal. It is expected that this interconnection power line, together with the 283 kilometres (176 mi) 230kV Dire Dawa–Nagad High Voltage Power Line, established in 2011, will form a transmission backbone for Djibouti on which to attach new energy sources and retire the expensive fossil power plants.

The entire power line in both countries is budgeted at US$75 million. Funding was sourced from the African Development Bank, the principal financier and the World Bank Group.

== Other considerations ==
The substation at Nagad will be expanded to accommodate the 230kV current, as part of this project.

== See also ==
- Energy in Ethiopia
- Energy in Djibouti
