= Loulwa bint Yazeed Al Saud =

Saudi royal and businesswoman

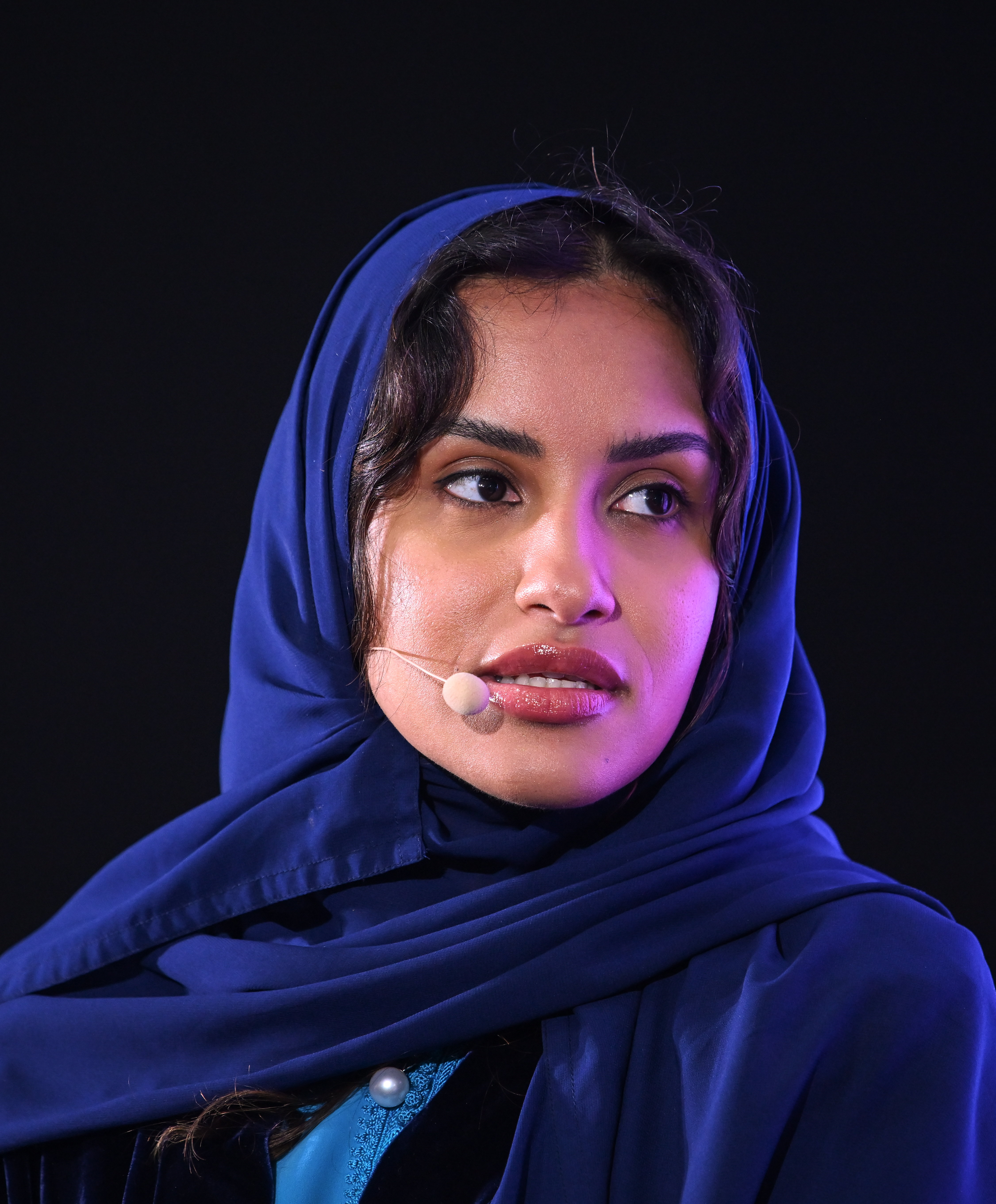
- Princess Loulwa in 2024
- Born: 1996 (age 28–29); Saudi Arabia
- House: House of Saud
- Father: Prince Yazeed bin Saud Al Saud
- Occupation: Businesswoman

Princess Loulwa bint Yazeed Al Saud (Arabic: لولوة بنت يزيد آل سعود) is a Saudi princess and businesswoman. She is the co-founder and CEO of RiseUp Saudi and the founder of fashion companies GoTrend and Plus966.

== Biography ==
She is the daughter of Prince Yazeed bin Saud bin Abdulaziz Al Saud. Her grandmother is Princess Samira bint Abdullah Al Faisal.

In 2022, Princess Loulwa founded Plus966, a fashion boutique consultancy, and also founded the Egyptian fashion e-commerce platform GoTrend. She is also the co-founder and chief executive officer of RiseUp Saudi, a platform to help start-ups in Saudi Arabia and hosts the RiseUp Summit, the largest entrepreneurship event in the Middle East and North Africa.

In September 2022, Loulwa was featured on the cover of Hia.

In May 2023, Loulwa spoke at the Forbes Middle East Women's Summit in Riyadh.
