= Samaira =

Samaira is a given name. Notable people with the name include:

- Samaira Mehta, American coder and inventor
- Samaira Rao (born 1989), Indian actress

== Fictional ==
- Samaira Dean, from Daybreak (2019 TV series)

== Film ==
- Samaira, 2022 Marathi language film
