= Corinne Bonnet =

Belgian historian of antiquity (born 1959)

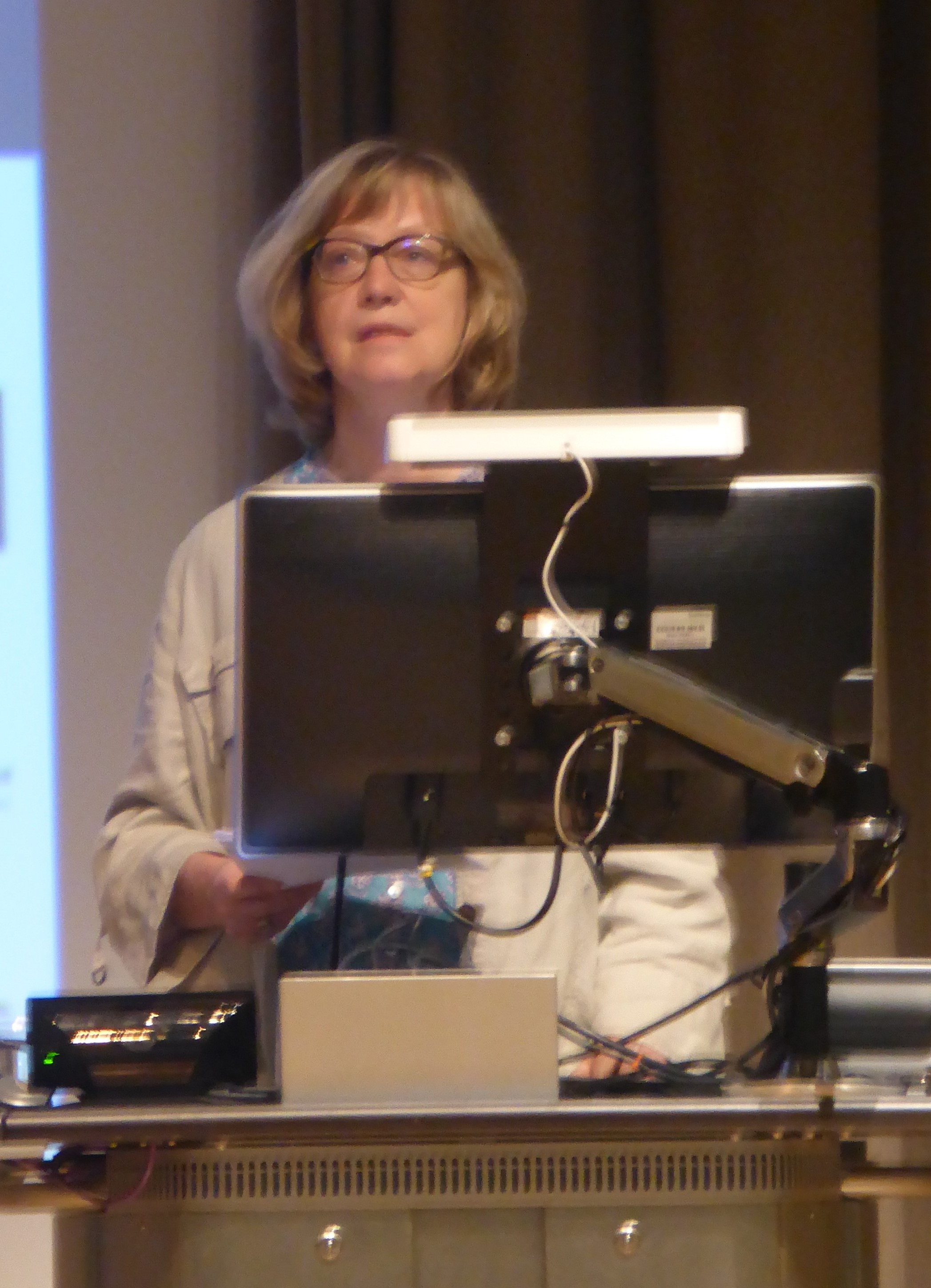

Academic background
- Education: University of Liège
- Thesis: Melqart. Cultes et mythes de l'Héralès tyrien en Méditerranée (1987)

Academic work
- Discipline: Classics
- Institutions: Pierre Mendès-France University; Scuola Normale Superiore

Corinne Bonnet is Professor of History of ancient religions at the Scuola Normale Superiore, Italy.

She is known for her work on ancient Mediterranean history and religion. She has been the Principal Investigator of the ERC Advanced Grant project Mapping Ancient Polytheisms.

== Education ==
Bonnet completed a degree in ancient history at the University of Liège in 1981. Her PhD, supervised by Jean Servais and Claude Baurain, was titled "Melqart. Cultes et mythes de l'Héraclès tyrien en Méditerranée" (Melquart. Cults and Myths of Tyrian Heracles in the Mediterranean) was awarded in 1987.

== Career ==
Bonnet taught at University of Namur (Notre-Dame de la Paix) from 1981 until 1991. In 1990–91, she was a Humboldt Fellow at the University of Tübingen. Subsequently, she held positions at the Pontifical Biblical Institute, the University of Calabria and Roma Tre University. In 2002, she completed her habilitation at Pierre Mendès-France University under the direction of Colette Jourdain Annequin with the project "Le « grand atelier de la science ». Franz Cumont et l'Altertumswissenschaft. Héritage et émancipations. Des études universitaires à la première guerre mondiale (1888-1923)."'

Since 2003, Bonnet has been Professor of Greek History at the University of Toulouse. She is deputy director of Labex SMS (Structuration des Mondes Sociaux), a social science research centre at the university which studies the structure of interpersonal and inter-organisational relationships. From October 2017 until September 2022, she is the Principal Investigator of the ERC project Mapping Ancient Polytheisms: Cult Epithets as an interface between religious systems and human agency.

From January 2024 she is professor of History of ancient religions at the Scuola Normale Superiore.

== Awards ==
Bonnet has received several prizes from the Royal Academy of Belgium: the E. Fagnan prize for Semitic Studies (1988), the H. Pirenne prize for her research on the archives of Franz Cumont (1998), and the F. Cumont prize for the history of religion (2014) for her book Les Enfants de Cadmos. Le paysage religieux de la Phénicie hellénistique. In 2011, she was elected a member of the Académie des Inscriptions et Belles-Lettres. In 2016, she was elected to the Academy of Europe, and in the same year received an honorary doctorate from the University of Lausanne. In July 2019, Bonnet was a keynote speaker at the XVth Congress of International Federation of Associations of Classical Studies and the Classical Association annual conference.

== Selected publications ==
- 1988, Melqart. Cultes et mythes de l'Héraclès tyrien en Méditerranée (Studia Phoenicia VIII = Bibliothèque de la Faculté de Philosophie et Lettres de Namur, 69), Leuven-Namur.
- 1991, with Cl. Baurain and V. Krings, Phoinikeia Grammata. Lire et écrire en Méditerranée. (Les Etudes Classiques), Namur-Liège.
- 1996, Astarté. Dossier documentaire et perspectives historiques (Contributi alla Storia della Religione Fenicio-Punica II), Rome: Consiglio Nazionale delle Ricerche.
- 1997, La correspondance scientifique de Franz Cumont conservée à l'Academia Belgica de Rome (Études de philologie, d'archéologie et d'histoire ancienne de l'Institut historique belge de Rome), Bruxelles-Rome.
- 2004. I Fenici, Rome: Carocci Editore.
- 2005, Le «grand atelier de la science». Franz Cumont et l'Altertumswissenschaft. Héritages et émancipations. Des études universitaires à la fin de la Ie Guerre mondiale, 1918-1923, 2 volumes (Études de philologie, d'archéologie et d'histoire anciennes de l'Institut historique belge de Rome XLI/1-2), Bruxelles-Rome.
- 2011, "On Gods and Earth: The Tophet and the Construction of a New identity in Punic Carthage", in E. Gruen (éd.), Cultural Identity in the Ancient Mediterranean, Los Angeles, p. 373-387.
- 2014, Les enfants de Cadmos. Les paysages religieux de la Phénicie hellénistique, Paris: De Boccard.
- 2014, "Greeks and Phoenicians in the Western Mediterranean", in J. McInerney (éd.), A Companion to Ethnicity in the Ancient Mediterranean, Oxford: Wiley Blackwell, p. 327-340.
