= Samir (disambiguation) =

Samir is an Arabic male given name.

Samir may also refer to:

- Samīr (given name), an Indian male given name
- Samir, fictional character in the 2009 Indian film New York
- Samir (crater), a lunar feature
- Samir (film), a 2019 American crime thriller
- German trawler V 209 Carl Röver, a 1933 ship renamed Samir

== See also ==
- Samiri (disambiguation)
- Sameer (disambiguation)
- Shameer (disambiguation)
