= Yosef Elboim =

Israeli rabbi

Rabbi Yosef Elboim יוסף אלבוים

Religious life
- Religion: Judaism

Yosef Elboim (Hebrew: יוסף אלבוים) is a rabbinical authority on the issues of the Temple Mount and a leading figure in the movement to rebuild the Temple (heb: התנועה לכינון המקדש). As the founder and head of the Movement for the Establishment of the Temple, he has led that group's efforts to prepare for a Third Temple, including the creation of the priestly garments and sacrificial instruments which have not been made since the Destruction of Jerusalem. He was also looking for baby boys to be raised in an isolated compound for the first 13 years of their life, to serve later as high priests in the future Third Temple.

He is considered "a leading proponent of going up to the Mount." In 2009, rare footage of Elboim with a group of Haredi Jews was publicized on a visit to the Temple Mount. Elboim had to defend himself by denying that he knew he was being filmed and that he did not want to make a provocation (within the Haredi community which does not condone visiting the Temple Mount).
