= Samira Brahmia =

Franco-Algerian singer-songwriter and actress

- Born: 9 May 1970 (age 56); France
- Citizenship: Algeria, France
- Occupations: Singer-songwriter, Actor

Samira Brahmia, born in the mid-1970s, is a Franco-Algerian singer-songwriter and actress, writing in Arabic, English and French.

== Biography ==
Samira Brahmia was born in Besançon, France, in the mid-1970s, while her father was studying there. Her family moved back to Algeria when she was a child, and she grew up there. In Algeria in the 1990s, during a decade of near-civil war, she dreamed of becoming a singer. From 1994, she was a backing singer, notably with the rock group Index. In 2001, she starred in the film L'Autre Monde by Algerian director Merzak Allouache, performing a song she had written. The film also sheds light on the situation in Algeria.

A few years later, in 2003, she tried her luck in France following a tour of that country, but was unable to make the career path she had hoped for on the other side of the Mediterranean a reality. A first album, Naïliya, was recorded, featuring her as singer-songwriter, and released in 2006. She also performed in various shows, for example with the Orchestre National de Barbès. She then had the opportunity to perform at the Cabaret Sauvage, in the 19th arrondissement of Paris, in various shows, such as Barbès café in the early 2010s. She also performed in other shows such as Les Folles Nuits Berbères and Cabaret Tam-Tam.

She then had the opportunity to take part in popular TV shows, such as season 4 of The Voice: La Plus Belle Voix, on French television in 2015, performing in particular the Arab-Andalusian song Haramtou Bik Nouassi, or the similar show in the Arab world, season 4 of The Voice Ahla Sawt, this time performing the song Ezzi Ssaa in Tamazigh. These shows helped to raise her profile. She was again selected as an actress by director Rachida Brakni, to star in the feature film, De sas en sas, released in 2016.

In 2022, she recorded and released her second album, Awa. The tracks, which she writes and composes, draw on Amazigh, Arabic, Mediterranean and African influences.
