= Samira Ćosović =

Serbian politician

Samira Ćosović (Serbian Cyrillic: Самира Ћосовић; born 19 November 1973) is a politician in Serbia. She was a member of the National Assembly of Serbia from 2020 to 2022 and is currently the deputy mayor of Prijepolje. Ćosović is a member of the Social Democratic Party of Serbia (SDPS) and also of its regional affiliate, the Sandžak Democratic Party.

== Private career ==
Ćosović is a Serbian language and literature teacher working at the "Svetozar Markovic" school in the village of Brodarevo.

== Politician ==
Ćosović received a mandate for the Prijepolje municipal assembly following the 2008 local elections and has been a member of assembly since then. She received the second position on the Sandžak Democratic Party's electoral list in the 2016 local election and the third position on a coalition list fronted by the party in the 2020 election. The lists won nine and eleven mandates, respectively, and she was returned on both occasions. After the 2016 election, she was elected as vice-president of the Sandžak Democratic Party's municipal board.

The SDPS contested the 2020 Serbian parliamentary election as part of an alliance led by the Serbian Progressive Party. Ćosović received the eightieth position on the alliance's Aleksandar Vučić — For Our Children list and was elected when the list won a landslide majority with 188 mandates. She was a member of the assembly's committee on education, science, technological development, and the information society; a deputy member of the culture and information committee, the environmental protection committee, and the European integration committee; the leader of Serbia's parliamentary friendship group with Iraq; and a member of the parliamentary friendship groups with Azerbaijan, the Bahamas, Bosnia and Herzegovina, Brazil, Croatia, France, Germany, Italy, Jamaica, Kuwait, Madagascar, Mauritius, Montenegro, Norway, Spain, Sri Lanka, Turkey, the United Arab Emirates, and Uzbekistan.

Ćosović was appointed as deputy mayor of Prijepolje on 25 December 2021. By virtue of holding an executive position at the municipal level, she was required to resign from the national assembly; her term in parliament formally ended on 21 January 2022.
