= Sameera Perera =

Sri Lankan cricketer (born 1988)

Sameera Perera (born 20 August 1988) is a Sri Lankan cricketer. He is a right-handed batsman and slow left-arm bowler who plays for Ragama Cricket Club. He was born in Kegalle.

Perera made his debut for the side during the 2009–10 season, against Colts, though he had to wait until his following appearance for his debut outing with the bat, scoring a duck against Chilaw Marians.
