= Samira Siahrostami =

Iranian computational chemist and academic

- Education: Isfahan University; Shiraz University
- Scientific career
- Workplaces: Simon Fraser University; University of Calgary; Stanford University; Technical University of Denmark
- Thesis: (2011)

Samira Siahrostami (Persian: سمیرا سیاه رستمی) is an Iranian-Canadian computational chemist who is an associate professor and Canada Research Chair at Simon Fraser University. She designs new materials for catalysis, and develops computer simulations to understand electrochemical reactions. She was awarded the 2023 Canadian Society for Chemistry Tom Zeigler Award.

== Early life and education ==
Siahrostami grew up in Iran, where she completed her undergraduate and graduate degree in physical chemistry. She moved to the Technical University of Denmark for a postdoctoral position at the Center for Atomic-scale Material Design. After two years in Denmark, she joined Stanford University, where she worked with Jens Nørskov and started working on computational catalysis.

== Research and career ==
Siahrostami joined the University of Calgary as an assistant professor in 2018, and was promoted to associate professor in 2022. Her research involves computational chemistry for the design of new catalyst materials. Specifically, she studies the oxygen reduction reaction and the carbon dioxide reduction reaction. The oxygen reduction reaction limits the efficiency of fuel cells. Siahrostami hopes that her simulations can provide insight about the active sites for oxygen reduction, helping to develop new, more efficient cathode materials. The carbon dioxide reduction reaction offers hope for carbon dioxide mitigation, as well as providing a new strategy to produce chemicals and fuels. Siahrostami makes use of carbon-based nanomaterials for carbon dioxide reduction reaction catalysis. Some of the catalysts that she has predicted computationally have since been commercialised.

Alongside reduction reactions, Siahrostami is interested in hydrogen: both the synthesis of hydrogen peroxide for water purification and the production of clean hydrogen.

== Awards and honours ==
- 2021 Royal Society of Chemistry John Jeyes Award
- 2023 Canadian Society for Chemistry Tom Ziegler Award
- 2023 ACS Energy Letters Women at the Forefront of Energy

== Selected publications ==
- Ambarish Kulkarni; Samira Siahrostami; Anjli Patel; Jens K Nørskov (6 February 2018). "Understanding Catalytic Activity Trends in the Oxygen Reduction Reaction". Chemical Reviews. 118 (5): 2302–2312. doi:10.1021/acs.chemrev.7b00488. ISSN 0009-2665. PMID 29405702. Wikidata Q48098693.
- Samira Siahrostami; Arnau Verdaguer-Casadevall; Mohammadreza Karamad; et al. (17 November 2013). "Enabling direct H2O2 production through rational electrocatalyst design". Nature Materials. 12 (12): 1137–1143. doi:10.1038/nmat3795. ISSN 1476-1122. PMID 24240242. Wikidata Q39313675.
- Vladimir Tripković; Egill Skúlason; Samira Siahrostami; Jens K. Nørskov; Jan Rossmeisl (November 2010). "The oxygen reduction reaction mechanism on Pt(111) from density functional theory calculations". Electrochimica Acta. 55 (27): 7975–7981. doi:10.1016/j.electacta.2010.02.056. ISSN 0013-4686. Wikidata Q63973894.
