= Samira bint Abdullah Al Saud =

Saudi royal and disability activist

- Born: Saudi Arabia
- House: House of Saud
- Father: Abdullah bin Faisal bin Turki Al Farhan Al Saud
- Occupation: philanthropist, disability activist

Princess Samira bint Abdullah Al Faisal Al Farhan Al Saud (also spelled Sameera) (Arabic: سميرة بنت عبدالله آل سعود) is a Saudi disability advocate, philanthropist, and member of the Saudi royal family. She works to promote awareness of disability in Saudi Arabia, particularly autism and schizophrenia. She is the Chairperson of the Saudi Schizophrenia Charity Association and the Charitable Society of Autism Families. She is the founder of the Charitable Society of Autism Families and established a center for autism in Riyadh. She was recognized for her service to people with disabilities by the government of the United Arab Emirates.

== Biography ==
Samira serves as the Chairperson of the Saudi Schizophrenia Charity Association. She is the founder and Chairperson of the Charitable Society of Autism Families, which works with Saudi hospitals and universities to increase autism awareness. She is also a member of the Saudi Autistic Society. Through her organization, she established a center for autism in Riyadh. She was recognized by the United Arab Emirates as the "Best Woman Volunteer in the Arab World" for her service to those with disabilities.

== Personal life ==
Princess Samira is a member of the Farhan-branch of the House of Saud. She has four children. One of her children has schizophrenia and another of her children has autism. She is the grandmother of Princess Loulwa bint Yazeed Al Saud whose father was a son of the late King Saud who ruled Saudi Arabia from 1953 to 1964.

She owned luxury vehicles including a Rolls-Royce Corniche Convertible chassis number DCX06738. She bought the white Rolls-Royce new in early July 1983 from the Rolls-Royce dealership in Jeddah, owned by Sheikh Mohamed Ashmawi (1935-2019). She then decided to change the colour to 'silver' before selling the vehicle in 1987. Since 1987 is the vehicle in Switzerland and private owned. The princess also bought a second Rolls-Royce Corniche coupé, chassis number CRX50653.
