= Sameer (disambiguation) =

Sameer is a masculine given name.

Sameer may also refer to:

- Sameer (film), a 2017 Bollywood film
- Sameer Cup 1996–97, a cricket tournament held in Kenya
- Sameer Group, a large conglomerate based in Kenya

== See also ==
- Samir (disambiguation)
- Shameer (disambiguation)
- Sameera (disambiguation)
