= Shameer =

Shameer may refer to:

- Shameer Aziq, Singapore international footballer
- Shameer Mon, former Indian athlete
- Shameer Muhammed, Indian film editor and producer
- Shameer Rasooldeen, Sri Lankan business person, journalist and a television news anchor

== See also ==
- Sameer (disambiguation)
- Samir (disambiguation)
- Shamir (disambiguation)
