= Jehoash Inscription =

Archaeological forgery

The Jehoash Inscription is the name of a controversial artifact claimed to have been discovered in a Muslim cemetery near the Temple Mount of Jerusalem during the 1990s. It was sold to the antiquities dealer Hassan Aqilan from East Jerusalem, who sold it to a well-known Israeli antiquities collector.

The inscription describes repairs made to various elements of a public building, including a portico, windows, spiral staircases, and more, possibly a temple, after donations were collected in the cities of Judah and among the desert dwellers. It corresponds to the account in 2 Kings chapter 12. Although the inscription does not explicitly mention the Temple (or the Temple of Yahweh) or the name of King Jehoash, it has commonly been referred to as the “Jehoash Inscription “.

While some scholars support the antiquity of the script and of the epigraphy of the inscription, and of the patina, the Israel Antiquities Authority asserted that the inscription is a modern-day forgery. Following their statement, the authenticity of the tablet became the subject of a major court case, during which approximately 70 senior scholars from around the world testified in fields such as paleography, biblical studies, archaeology, archaeometry, patina analysis, geology, stone carving, and more. After seven years of legal proceedings, the Jerusalem District Court ruled that the state had not proven that the inscription was a forgery, and the owner was acquitted of all charges related to it.

The state did not appeal the decision, but at this stage requested the confiscation of the tablet, claiming that an object that might be of such importance should remain in the hands of the state. However, the Supreme Court rejected the state’s position and ordered that the artifact be returned to its owner.

== Text of the inscription ==
=== The tablet ===
[אנכי · יהואש · בן · א]
חזיהו . מ[
הדה . ואעש . את . הב[...]
ה . כאשר . נמלאה . נד
בת . לב אש . בארץ . ובמד
בר . ובכל . ערי . יהדה . ל
תת · כסף · הקדשם · לרב ·
לקנת · אבן · מחצב · ובר
שם . ונחשת . אדמ . לעשת .
במלאכה . באמנה . ואעש
את . בדק . הבית . והקרת ס
בב . ואת . היצע . והשבכ
ם . והלולם . והגרעת . וה
דלתת . והיה . הים . הזה
לעדת . כי . תצלח . המלאכה
יצו . יהוה . את . עמו . בברכה

— Original Hebrew text
Translation:

[I am Jehoash, son of A-]
-haziah, k[ing of Ju-]
dah, and I performed the work on th[is ho]us-
e. When men's gener-
osity was full in the land and in the wilder-
ness, and in all the cities of Judah, to
give money as sacred donations abundantly,
to buy stone and juniper
wood and Edomite copper, performing
the work in good faith–then I ma-
de the repair of the Temple, and of the encircling wa-
lls, and the storied structure, and the lattice-
s, and the spiral stairs, and the re-
cesses, and the doors. And this day will become
a testimony that the work will prosper.
May Yahweh ordain His people with blessing.

— English translation

=== Police investigation ===
Israeli magazine Maariv correspondent Boaz Gaon reported that the Israel Antiquities Authority Theft Unit had focused their attention on the "Jehoash Inscription" as expensive bait to defraud a prominent collector in London. Israeli investigators linked a phony business card and a phone number to a Tel Aviv private eye who admitted that his employer was Oded Golan, the collector who owned the James Ossuary (another artifact of uncertain authenticity). Golan denied that he was the owner of the stone and claimed that the real owner was a Palestinian antiquities dealer who lived in an area under Palestinian Authority and could not be identified.

A March 19, 2003, article in Maariv reported that a court had issued a search warrant for Golan's apartment, office and rented warehouse. The search brought forth allegedly incriminating documents and photographs of Golan beside the Jehoash Inscription. Under interrogation, Golan promised to reveal the location of the stone in exchange for immunity from prosecution.

Police then conducted a new search in a storage space that Golan had rented in Ramat Gan but had not originally disclosed to them. There the police found scores of artifacts, ancient seals and other inscriptions in various stages of production along with the tools to create the imitations. Under harsh questioning, Golan admitted that he knew about the Jehoash Inscription and promised to hand it over.

On March 14, 2012 Jerusalem Judge Aharon Farkash stated "that there is no evidence that any of the major artifacts were forged, and that the prosecution failed to prove their accusations beyond a reasonable doubt." However, the court also ruled that it was unable to conclude that the Jehoash Inscription was authentic and noted that an associate of the accused forgers had confessed to aiding in its fabrication.

=== Israel Antiquities Authority commission ===
Limor Livnat, Israeli Minister of Culture, appointed a scientific commission to study the Jehoash tablet, as well as the James Ossuary.

The commission concluded that various mistakes in the spelling and the mixture of different alphabets indicated that this was a modern forgery. The stone was typical of western Cyprus and areas further west. Patina over the chiseled letters was different from that of the back of the stone and could easily be wiped off the stone by hand. In a press conference in Jerusalem on June 18, 2003 the Israel Antiquities Authority commission declared the inscription a modern forgery.

== Patina Tests and Radiocarbon Dating ==
A report, dated September 2005, was prepared by Wolfgang E. Krumbein of the Carl von Ossietzky University of Oldenburg, Germany. Krumbein concludes that "Doubtlessly the patina is continuous in many places throughout surface and lettering grooves in the case of ossuary and tablet. On the other hand a proof of forgery is not given by the experts nominated by the Israel Antiquities Authority."

== Scholarly opinion ==
Israeli historian Nadav Na'aman, who had theorized that the books of the Kings could be based on public inscriptions, opined that a forger could have used his (Na'aman's) theory as a basis for a forgery. Frank Cross of Harvard University noted various errors in spelling and terminology. Yuval Goren of Tel-Aviv University demonstrated how the convincing fake could be produced by abrasive airbrushing. The stone itself remained hidden.

In an article published in 2007, Professor Chaim Cohen of Ben Gurion University wrote, "both the nature of these contributions and the fact that they are completely new do support my long-standing position concerning the authenticity of the YI [Jehoash Inscription] as follows: In order to remove any possible doubt concerning my position as regards the authenticity of the YI, I wish to emphasize at the outset that I do not know whether or not this inscription is genuine. I do contend, however, that it can not be proven philologically to be a modern-day forgery. I would also add that if nevertheless the YI does turn out to be a forgery, then it is a most brilliant forgery in my opinion."

Victor Sasson responds that "the sandstone inscription need not be the first and original record. If the stone itself cannot scientifically be dated to late ninth century B.C.E., then the text could be a later copy of an original inscription... We do indeed have a reference to a possible renovation or restoration of an inscription. The author of the Tell Fakhriyah Assyrian-Aramaic bilingual inscription, dated to the mid-ninth century B.C.E., speaks of a possible future renovation of his inscription."

Prof. Ronny Reich who played a key role in the widely publicized case of the antiquities collector accused of fraud, and was one of the founders of the Israel Antiquities Authority stated "Finally, allow me to play devil's advocate and say that the inscription appears to me to be authentic, because it's hard for me to believe that a forger (or group of forgers) could be so knowledgeable in all aspects of the inscription − that is, the physical, paleographic, linguistic and biblical ones − that they could produce such an object."

In a review article published in 2012, Rosenfeld, Feldman, Kronfeld and Krumbein summarized their earlier published studies and reviewed the expert testimony given at the trial of Oded Golan. They supported the judge's conclusion that the forgery of the artifact could not be proved, and stated that the trial evidence confirmed their own earlier conclusion that it is most probably genuine. A scientific analysis of the stone's patina carried out by this team determined a radiocarbon age of 2340 to 2150 Cal BP, supporting, in their opinion, "the antiquity of the patina, which in turn, strengthens the contention that the inscription is authentic."

In mid-2013, after judge Aaron Farkash of the Jerusalem District Court ruled that the state had failed to prove the artefact was a forgery, the state applied to the Supreme Court to obtain an official requiring the owner of the artefact, Golan, to consign it to the State without payment. The Supreme Court ruled against the Israel Antiquities Authority, returning the tablet and ossuary to Golan, who intends to publicly display both.

In February 2016, Professor Ed Greenstein, Bar-Ilan University, Israel, published an update review article, The So-Called Jehoash Inscription: A Post Mortem, commenting on the various scholarly analyses of the tablet and its inscription. Greenstein, a Semitic philologist, contends that the inscription contains "anomalies—spellings and linguistic usages that did not jibe with what we know of ancient Hebrew writing and language." He also quotes paleographer Christopher Rollston for the assertion that the relative height of some letters is incorrect. Greenstein concludes:

The judge, overwhelmed by the diverse testimony, was inconclusive. However, the judgment of scholars who read ancient texts and analyze their language and writing is clear: no textbook of ancient Hebrew inscriptions will ever include the so-called Jehoash text; no historian of ancient Israel will ever count the inscription as a source; no grammarian or lexicographer of ancient Hebrew will ever include words, phrases, or forms found in the inscription as genuine data.

== See also ==
- Biblical archaeology
- List of inscriptions in biblical archaeology
- Archaeological forgery

== Sources ==
- Neil Asher Silberman and Yuval Goren, "Faking Biblical History", Archeology magazine, September/October 2003
- Jonathon Gatehouse, "Cashbox", 'Maclean's' magazine, March 2005
- Greenstein, Edward L. (2012). "Methodological Principles in Determining That the So-Called Jehoash Inscription is Inauthentic". In Lundberg, Marilyn J.; Fine, Steven; Pitard, Wayne T. (eds.). Puzzling Out the Past: Studies in Northwest Semitic Languages and Literatures in Honor of Bruce Zuckerman. BRILL. pp. 83–92. ISBN 978-90-04-22716-3.
- Amnon Rosenfeld, Shimon Ilani, Howard R. Feldman, Wolfgang E. Krumbein, Joel Kronfeld (2009). "Archaeometric evidence for the authenticity of the Jehoash inscription tablet". Antiguo Oriente 7: 57-73.
- Sasson, Victor. King Jehoash and the Mystery of the Temple of Solomon Inscription. iUniverse, Paperback, 240 pages, March 28, 2008.
- Sasson, Victor. A response to N.A. Silberman and Y. Goren's article in the form of a letter to Archaeology magazine was not accepted by that magazine (letter date, October 2003). It was eventually published in the listhost.uchicago.edu[ANE] in early March 2004. The letter is also in King Jehoash and the Mystery of the Temple of Solomon Inscription, pp. 90–92.
