= Solomon's shamir =

Mythical worm

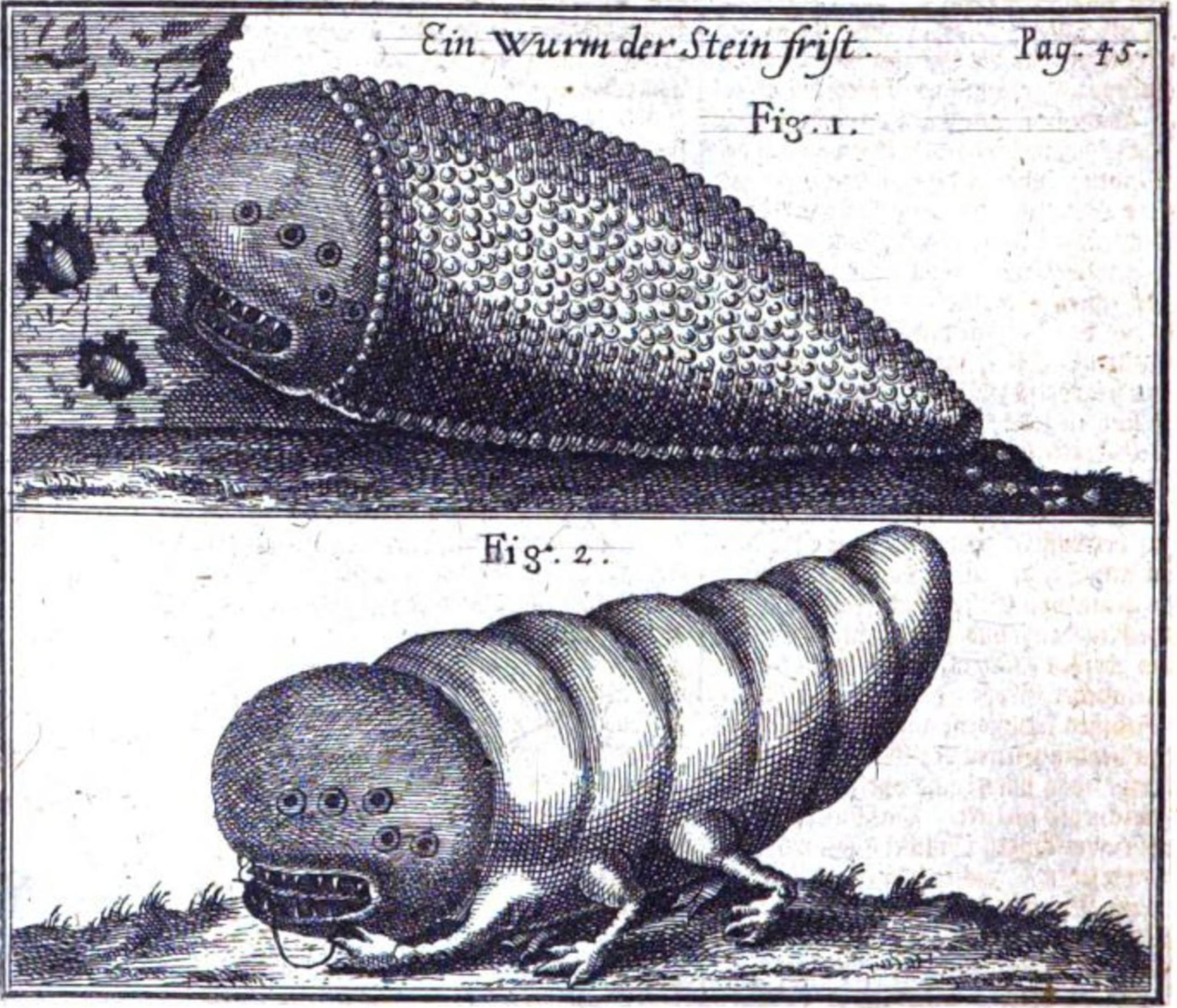
Solomon's shamir, according to Eberhard Werner Happel, 1707

In the Gemara, the shamir (Biblical Hebrew: שָׁמִיר, romanized: šāmir) is a worm or a substance that had the power to cut through or disintegrate stone, iron and diamond. Solomon is said to have used it in the building of the first Temple in Jerusalem in place of cutting tools. For the construction of Solomon's Temple, which promoted peace, it was inappropriate to use tools that could also cause war and bloodshed.

Referenced throughout the Talmud and midrashim, the Shamir was reputed to have existed in the time of Moses as one of the ten wonders created on the eve of the first Shabbat just before God finished creation. (Note: Ten things were created on the eve of the Sabbath at twilight, and these are they: [1] the mouth of the earth, [2] the mouth of the well, [3] the mouth of the donkey, [4] the rainbow, [5] the manna, [6] the staff [of Moses], [7] the shamir, [8] the letters, [9] the writing, [10] and the tablets. And some say: also the demons, the grave of Moses, and the ram of Abraham, our father. And some say: and also tongs, made with tongs.) Moses reputedly used the Shamir to engrave the stones of the priestly breastplate of the High Priest of Israel.

== The Temple ==
King Solomon, aware of the existence of the Shamir but unaware of its location, commissioned a search that turned up a "grain of Shamir the size of a barleycorn." Solomon's artisans reputedly used the Shamir in the construction of the Temple. The material to be worked, whether stone, wood or metal, was affected by being "shown to the Shamir." Following this line of logic (anything that can be 'shown' something must have eyes to see), early Rabbinical scholars described the Shamir almost as a living being. Other early sources, however, describe it as a green stone. This is supported by contemporary scholars who believe that the Shamir was emery, a blue-green stone mined as an abrasive powder for thousands of years. The word emery comes from Koine Greek: σμύρις, romanized: smúris, which likely shares the same root as the Semitic shamir.

For storage, the Shamir was meant to have been always wrapped in wool and stored in a container made of lead; any other vessel would burst and disintegrate under the Shamir's gaze. The Shamir was said to have been either lost or had lost its potency (along with the "dripping of the honeycomb") by the time of the destruction of the First Temple during the Siege of Jerusalem (587 BC).

== Asmodeus ==
According to the Asmodeus legend from the Talmud, Tractate Gittin 68a-b, the location of the Shamir was told to King Solomon by Asmodeus, whom Solomon captured. Asmodeus was captured by Benaiah ben Jehoiada, who captured the demon king by pouring wine into Asmodeus' well, making him drunk, and wrapping him in chains that were engraved with a sacred name of God. Once captured, Asmodeus is brought to Solomon in Jerusalem, where Asmodeus informs Solomon that the Shamir was not given to him, but to Rahab, the angel of the sea. The angel of the sea had then given the Shamir to a bird, identified by the Talmud as the Hoopoe (Hebrew: דּוּכִיפַת, romanized: Duk̲ip̄at̲), who had been using the Shamir to split rocks to build its nests. The Shamir is then retrieved by placing glass over the Hoopoe's nest, forcing the bird to use the Shamir to break through the glass.

== Gemstones ==
King Solomon also used the Shamir to engrave gemstones. He also used the blood of the Shamir worm to make carved jewels with a mystical seal or design. According to an interview with George Frederick Kunz, an expert in gemstone and jewelry lore, this led to the belief that gemstones so engraved would have magical virtues, and they often also ended up with their own powers or guardian angel associated with either the gem or the precisely engraved gemstones.

== In Islam ==
The Quran mentions a creature thought to be the Shamir, when pointing out the ignorance of the jinn who worked for Solomon concerning the occult, and emphasizing that all knowledge rests only with God:

And when We decreed death for him, nothing showed his death to them save a creeping creature of the earth which gnawed away his staff. And when he fell, the jinn saw clearly how, if they had known the Unseen, they would not have continued in despised toil. surat Saba' 34:14

According to commentators such as ibn Abbas, when Solomon died his body remained leaning on his staff for a long time, nearly a year, until "a creature of the earth, which was a kind of worm," gnawed through the stick weakening it and the body fell to the ground. It was then that the jinn knew that he had died a long time before and until then they were working hard thinking he was supervising them. It also became clear to humans who divined and engaged in occult activities or spirit-consulting, or worshipped the jinn, that they do not possess knowledge of the occult.

== In Indian culture ==
Vajrakita is a kind of worm able to gnaw through stone, esp. shaligrams.

== In popular culture ==
- Leonard Tushnet's story "The Worm Shamir", published in the December 1968 issue of Fantasy & Science Fiction, retells the legend in modern, quasi-scientific terms.
- In The Secret Saturdays, shamir are centipede-like creatures V. V. Argost uses to clean and repair his mansion.
