= Samir =

- Pronunciation: /səmiːr/ /sæˈmiːr/
- Gender: Male

Origin
- Meaning: Arabic: "holy", "jovial", "loyal", "charming"; Albanian: "exquisite", "superb", "perfect"

Samir (also spelled Sameer) is a masculine given name of multiple origins. In Arabic, Samir (سمير) means "holy", "jovial", "loyal", or "charming". In Albanian, it literally means "so good" but loosely "exquisite", "superb", or "perfect". Samira is the feminine spelling. Notable people with the name include:

== Given name ==
=== Sameer ===
- Sameer (Telugu actor) (born 1973), Indian actor
- Sameer Abdulshaker (born 1960), Saudi footballer
- Sameer Ambekar (born 1981), Indian sport shooter
- Sameer Anjaan, Indian lyricist
- Sameer Athalye, Indian cinematographer
- Sameer Bandekar (born 1964), Indian cricket umpire
- Sameer Bhujbal (born 1973), Indian politician
- Sameer Choudhary (born 1999), Indian cricketer
- Sameer Dad (born 1978), Indian field hockey player
- Sameer Dattani (born 1982), Indian businessman and actor
- Sameer Dharmadhikari (born 1978), Indian film and television actor
- Sameer Dighe (born 1968), Indian cricket player and coach
- Sameer Asad Gardezi (born 1983), Pakistani-American screenwriter and television writer
- Sameer Gehlaut (born 1974), British-Indian entrepreneur and investor
- Sameer Gupta (born 1976), Indian-American jazz percussionist, tabla player, and composer
- Sameer Hilal (born 1967), Saudi footballer
- Sameer Hinduja, American social scientist
- Sameer Hussain (born 1982), Pakistani field hockey player
- Sameer Kanal, American politician
- Sameer Gulamnabi Kazi, Indian politician
- Sameer Khakhar (1952–2023), Indian film and television actor
- Sameer Kulavoor (born 1983), Indian contemporary artist
- Sameer Maskey, Nepalese computer scientist
- Sameer Meghe (born 1978), Indian politician
- Sameer Minhas (born 2006), Pakistani cricketer
- Sameer Nair (born 1965), Indian media executive
- Sameer Oraon, Indian politician
- Sameer Parekh, Indian-American businessman
- Sameer Patel (born 1976), English cricketer
- Sameer Iqbal Patel (born 1979), Indian film director, producer, writer, actor, and model
- Sameer Phaterpekar, Indian score composer
- Sameer Rahim, British literary journalist and novelist
- Sameer Rajda (born 1963), Indian actor
- Sameer Rao (born 1982), Indian flautist
- Sameer Reddy (born 1971), Indian film cinematographer
- Sameer Rizvi (born 2003), Indian cricketer
- Sameer P. Sarkar, British psychiatrist
- Sameer Saxena (admiral), Indian Navy officer
- Sameer Shah, Indian actor
- Sameer Sharma (1976–2020), Indian television actor
- Sameer Sharma (director), Indian film director
- Sameer Suleman, Malawian politician
- Sameer Suneja, Indian executive
- Sameer Tanti (born 1955), Indian poet, storyteller, translator, painter, and social worker
- Sameer Thahir (born 1976), Indian cinematographer, screenwriter, producer, and film director
- Sameer Verma (born 1994), Indian badminton player
- Sameer Vidwans, Indian film director and writer
- Sameer Wankhede (born 1979), Indian bureaucrat
- Sameer Zia (born 1981), Pakistani-Emirati cricketer
- Sameer Zuberi (born 1979), Canadian politician
- Sameer Zuberi (physician), British physician

=== Samir ===
- Samir (Cape Verdean footballer) (born 1988), Cape Verdean footballer
- Samir (filmmaker) (born 1955), Swiss-Iraqi filmmaker
- Samir (football manager) (born 1961), Moroccan football manager
- Samir (footballer, born 1981) (born 1981), Brazilian footballer
- Samir (footballer, born 1994) (born 1994), Brazilian footballer
- Samir Abasov (born 1978), Azerbaijani football manager and player
- Samir Abbès (born 1990), French footballer
- Samir Abdellaoui (born 1980), Tunisian politician
- Samir Abdul-Ridha (born 1960), Iraqi footballer
- Samir Aboud (born 1972), Libyan footballer
- Samir Adam (born 1983), Mozambican basketball player
- Samir Aiboud (born 1993), Algerian footballer
- Samir Alakbarov (born 1968), Azerbaijani footballer
- Samir Alhafith, Australian technical diver, cave explorer, and underwater filmmaker
- Samir Aliyev (born 1979), Azerbaijani footballer
- Samir Allioui (born 1983), Dutch politician
- Samir Altaqi (born 1951), Syrian researcher and political activist
- Samir Amin (1931–2018), Egyptian-French economist and political scientist
- Samir Amirèche (born 1972), French-Algerian footballer
- Samir Arab (born 1994), Maltese footballer
- Samir Arora (born 1965), Indian-American businessman
- Samir Arzú (born 1981), Honduran footballer
- Samir Assaf (born 1960), Lebanese businessman and banker
- Samir Atallah (born 1941), Lebanese journalist, author, and political analyst
- Samir Avdić (born 1967), Bosnian politician and basketball player
- Samir Bertin d'Avesnes (born 1986), Comorian footballer
- Samir Ayadi (1947–2008), Tunisian playwright
- Samir Ayass (born 1990), Lebanese footballer
- Samir Azzimani (born 1977), Moroccan-French skier
- Samir Azzouz (born 1986), Dutch-Moroccan terrorist
- Samir Badran (born 1990), Swedish television personality and singer
- Samir Bağırov (born 1967), Azerbaijani pop singer
- Samir Bajtarević (born 1969), Bosnian footballer
- Samir Bakaou (born 1954), Tunisian footballer
- Samir Banerjee (born 2003), American tennis player
- Samir Bannout (born 1955), Lebanese bodybuilder
- Samir Barać (born 1973), Croatian water polo player
- Samir Ranjan Barman (born 1940), Indian politician
- Samir Bayramov (born 1999), Russian footballer
- Samir Bekrić (born 1984), Bosnian footballer
- Samir Bellahcene (born 1995), French handball player
- Samir Belloumou (born 1994), French footballer
- Samir Beloufa (born 1979), French-Algerian footballer
- Samir Benamar (born 1992), Moroccan footballer
- Samir Benchenaf (born 1980), Algerian Greco-Roman wrestler
- Samir Bengelloun (born 1985), French footballer
- Samir Benghanem (born 1993), Dutch handball player
- Samir Bhamra (born 1975), British artist and playwright
- Samir Bishara (1935–2010), Egyptian orthodontist
- Samir Boitard, French actor
- Samir Boughanem (born 1975), Moroccan footballer
- Samir Bouguerra (born 1982), Algerian Greco-Roman wrestler
- Samir Bousenine (born 1991), Andorran footballer
- Samir Bouzar (born 1999), French footballer
- Samir Brahimi (born 1990), Algerian boxer
- Samir K. Brahmachari (born 1952), Indian biophysicist
- Samir Brikho (born 1958), Lebanese-Swedish businessman
- Samir Carruthers (born 1993), British footballer
- Samir Ćeremida (born 1964), Bosnian musician
- Samir Chakrabarti (1943–2015), Indian cricketer
- Samir Chakraborty, Indian politician
- Samir Chamas (1942–2024), Lebanese actor, writer, and voice actor
- Samir Chammam, Tunisian football manager
- Samir Chanda (1957–2011), Indian art director and production designer
- Samir Chaudhuri, Indian pediatrician and humanitarian
- Samir Chergui (born 1999), French-Algerian footballer
- Samir Choughule (born 1973), Indian actor and writer
- Samir Dahmani (born 1991), French middle-distance runner
- Samir Das, Indian-American academic
- Samir Dash (born 1982), Indian entrepreneur
- Samir Ranjan Dash, Indian politician
- Samir Dey (1957–2024), Indian politician
- Samir Dilou (born 1966), Tunisian politician
- Samir Doughty (born 1997), American basketball player
- Samir Duro (born 1977), Bosnian footballer
- Samir Abu Eisheh (born 1960), Palestinian politician, civil engineer, and professor
- Samir Elmesirri (born 1941), Egyptian artist
- Samir Farid (1943–2017), Egyptian writer, critic, journalist, and film historian
- Samir Abdel Fattah (born 1971), Yemeni short story writer, novelist, and playwright
- Samir Fazlagić (born 1982), Norwegian footballer
- Samir Fazli (born 1991), Macedonian footballer
- Samir Feriani, Tunisian whistleblower
- Samir Frangieh (1945–2017), Lebanese politician
- Samir El Gaaouiri (born 1984), Dutch footballer
- Samir Galloul (born 1976), Algerian footballer
- Samir Ganguly, Indian film director
- Samir Geagea (born 1952), Lebanese politician
- Samir Ghanem (1937–2021), Egyptian comedian
- Samir Gharbo (1925–2018), Egyptian water polo player
- Samir Ghawshah (1937–2009), Palestinian politician and militia leader
- Samir Gouda (born 1972), Egyptian-Ukrainian basketball player and coach
- Samir Guesmi (born 1967), French actor and film director
- Samir Gurbanov (born 2001), Azerbaijani footballer
- Samir Habashneh (born 1951), Jordanian politician
- Samir Habiby (born 1933), Palestinian-American pastor, military chaplain, and humanitarian
- Samir Hadjaoui (1979–2021), Algerian footballer
- Samir Hadji (born 1989), Moroccan footballer
- Samir Handanovič (born 1984), Slovenian footballer
- Samir Haouam (born 1968), Algerian athlete
- Samir Saïd Haribou (born 2007), French footballer
- Samir Hasanov (born 1967), Ukrainian football player and manager
- Samir Kadhim Hassan (born 1969), Iraqi footballer
- Samir Hassaniyeh, Sierra Leonean civil right activist
- Samir Houhou (born 1968), Algerian football player and manager
- Samir Hulileh (born 1957), Kuwaiti-Palestinian politician
- Samir Husni (born 1953), Lebanese-American magazine analyst
- Samir Jabrayilov (born 1994), Ukrainian-Azerbaijani cyclist
- Samir Jain (born 1954), Indian publisher
- Samir Kumar Jana (born 1950), Indian politician
- Samir Javadzadeh (born 1980), Azerbaijani pop singer
- Samir Jisr (born 1944), Lebanese politician and lawyer
- Samir Jouili (born 1963), Tunisian football manager
- Samir Jundi (born 1958), Palestinian writer and publisher
- Samir Kachayev (1994–2016), Azerbaijani sculptor
- Samir Kafity (1932–2015), Palestinian Anglican bishop
- Samir Kamouna (born 1972), Egyptian football coach and player
- Samir Karabašić (born 1966), Bosnian canoeist
- Samir Karnik (born 1974), Indian film director, producer, and screenwriter
- Samir Kassir (1960–2005), Lebanese politician
- Samir Kayande (born 1972), Canadian politician
- Samir El-Khadem (born 1942), Lebanese Navy officer
- Samir Khader, Iraqi journalist
- Samir Khalaf (born 1933), Lebanese sociologist
- Samir Khan (1985–2011), Saudi jihadist
- Samir Khotko (born 1968), Russian historian
- Samir Khuller (born 1965), Indian computer scientist
- Samir Kochhar (born 1980), Indian actor and television presenter
- Samir Kouro (born 1978), Chilean engineer
- Samir Kozarac (born 1981), Swiss footballer
- Samir Trimbakrao Kunawar, Indian politician
- Samir Kuntar (1962–2015), Lebanese militant
- Samir Labidi (born 1962), Tunisian politician
- Samir Lacheheb (born 1988), French-Algerian footballer
- Samir Lagsir (born 2003), Dutch footballer
- Samir Lamouchi (born 1951), Tunisian volleyball player
- Samir Lemoudaâ (born 1981), Algerian footballer
- Samir Lerić (born 1973), Bosnian basketball player
- Samir Louadj (born 1985), French footballer
- Samir-Adel Louahla (born 1974), Algerian sprinter
- Samir Maalouf, Lebanese actor and voice actor
- Samir Maarouf (born 2001), Swedish-Palestinian footballer
- Samir Machado de Machado (born 1981), Brazilian writer, editor, translator, and graphic designer
- Samir Maharramli (born 2002), Azerbaijani footballer
- Samir Kumar Mahaseth (born 1958), Indian politician
- Samir El-Mais (born 1980), Emirati-Canadian boxer
- Samir Abduh Sa'id al-Maktawi (born 1968), Yemeni-Saudi accused terrorist
- Samir Malcuit (born 1985), French footballer
- Samir Mallal, Canadian filmmaker
- Samir Mammadov (born 1988), Azerbaijani boxer
- Samir Mane (born 1967), Albanian entrepreneur
- Samir Masimov (born 1995), Azerbaijani-Russian footballer
- Samir D. Mathur, Indian theoretical physicist
- Samir Mazloum (born 1934), Lebanese Maronite Catholic hierarch
- Samir Mehanović, British-Bosnian film director
- Samir Memišević (born 1993), Bosnian footballer
- Samir Merzić (born 1984), Bosnian footballer
- Samir Mitragotri (born 1971), Indian-American professor
- Samir Modi (born 1969), Indian businessman
- Samir Mohamed (born 2003), Egyptian footballer
- Samir Si Hadj Mohand (born 1982), Algerian footballer
- Samir Mohanty (Jharkhand politician) (born 1971), Indian politician
- Samir Mohanty (Odisha politician) (born 1959), Indian politician
- Samir Mondal (born 1952), Indian watercolor painter
- Samir Naji Al Hasan Moqbel (born 1977), Yemeni Guantanamo detainee
- Samir Mouqbel (born 1939), Lebanese politician
- Samir El Mourabet (born 2005), French-Moroccan footballer
- Samir Moussaab (died 2007), Algerian terrorist
- Samir Moussaoui (born 1975), Algerian long-distance runner
- Samir El Moussaoui (born 1986), Dutch footballer
- Samir Mujanović (born 1966), Bosnian basketball player
- Samir Murad (born 1957), Jordanian businessman
- Samir Muratović (born 1976), Bosnian football coach and player
- Samir Musayev (born 1979), Azerbaijani footballer
- Samir Nabi (born 1996), British-Pakistani footballer
- Samir Nabiyev (born 1986), Azerbaijani Paralympic athlete
- Samir Naik (born 1979), Indian football player and coach
- Samir Abdul Aziz al-Najim (born 1937), Iraqi politician
- Samir El-Najjar (born 1956), Syrian judoka
- Samir Naqqash (1938–2004), Israeli writer
- Samir Nashar (born 1945/46), Syrian politician
- Samir Nasri (born 1987), French footballer
- Samir Nassar (born 1950), Lebanese Catholic hierarch
- Samir Nouioua (born 1985), Algerian Paralympic athlete
- Samir Nuriyev (born 1975), Azerbaijani politician
- Samir Nurković (born 1992), Serbian footballer
- Samir Okasha, Egyptian-British historian
- Samir Kumar Panja, Indian politician
- Samir Kumar Poddar, Indian politician
- Samir Putatundu (1952–2026), Indian politician
- Samir Qasimi (born 1974), Algerian writer
- Samir Qotb (1938–2006), Egyptian footballer
- Samir Radwan (1942–2026), Egyptian politician
- Samir Rafi (1926–2004), Egyptian painter
- Samir Raja (born 1994), Jordanian footballer
- Samir Ramizi (born 1991), Serbian footballer
- Samir Abi Rashed (born 1947), Lebanese painter
- Samir Rehem, Canadian film and television director
- Samir Rifai (born 1966), Jordanian politician
- Samir Al-Rifai (1901–1965), Jordanian politician and statesman
- Samir Roychoudhury (1933–2016), Indian poet and writer
- Samir Rzayev (born 1980), Azerbaijani aviation executive
- Samir Saba (born 1981), Dominican journalist and television producer
- Samir Sabih (1970–2021), Iraqi poet
- Samir Sabry (born 1976), Egyptian footballer
- Samir Sadikhov (born 1990), Azerbaijani automotive designer
- Samir Safarov (born 1979), Azerbaijani military officer
- Samir Kumar Saha (born 1955), Bangladeshi microbiologist and public health expert
- Samir Sahiti (born 1988), Albanian footballer
- Samir Said (1963–2012), Kuwaiti footballer
- Samir Aït Saïd (born 1989), French artistic gymnast
- Samir Bin Said, Israeli-Arab politician
- Samir Saïed (born 1957), Tunisian politician
- Samir Saker (born 1971), Egyptian mathematician
- Samir Salameh (1944–2018), Palestinian-French visual artist
- Samir Ben Sallam (born 2001), Dutch footballer
- Samir Khalil Samir (born 1938), Egyptian priest, Islamic scholar, Orientalist, and Catholic theologian
- Samir Sammoun (born 1952), Canadian–Lebanese artist and telecommunications engineer
- Samir Deb Sarkar (died 2016), Indian politician
- Samir Sarsare (born 1975), Moroccan footballer
- Samir Loutfi El-Sayed (born 1945), Egyptian volleyball player
- Samir El-Sayiad (born 1935), Egyptian politician
- Samir Seif (1947–2019), Egyptian director and writer
- Samir Selešković (born 1970), Bosnian basketball player
- Samir Seliminski (born 1969), Bulgarian football player and manager
- Samir Sellami (born 1977), Tunisian volleyball player
- Samir Sellimi (born 1970), Tunisian footballer
- Samir Selmanovic (born 1965), Croatian-American Christian minister
- Samir Shah (born 1952), British television and radio executive
- Samir S. Shah, American medical doctor
- Samir Shaker (born 1958), Iraqi footballer
- Samir Shaptahoviç (born 1981), Kosovar-Albanian basketball player
- Samir Sharifov (born 1961), Azerbaijani politician
- Samir Sheikh (born 1978), English first-class cricketer
- Samir Shihabi (1925–2010), Palestinian-Saudi lawyer
- Samir Kumar Singh, Indian politician
- Samir Kumar Sinha (born 1969), Indian Administrative Service officer
- Samir Soni (born 1968), Indian film and television actor and fashion model
- Samir Sumaidaie (born 1944), Iraqi politician
- Samir Tabaković (born 1967), Bosnian football manager and player
- Samir Taha (born 1961), Palestinian physician and diplomat
- Samir Tamang (born 2006), Nepalese footballer
- Samir Tandir (born 1984), Serbian politician
- Samir Toplak (born 1970), Croatian football manager and player
- Samir Trabelsi (born 1968), Canadian-Tunisian economist
- Samir Ujkani (born 1988), Albanian footballer
- Samir Upadhyay, Nepalese-American film producer
- Samir Vincent (born 1940), Iraqi-American convicted criminal
- Samir Al Wahaj (born 1979), Libyan footballer
- Samir Xaud (born 1984), Brazilian doctor, businessman, and sports executive
- Samir El-Youssef (born 1965), Palestinian-British writer and critic
- Samir Yusifov (born 1994), Russian footballer
- Samir Zamfir (born 1967), Romanian footballer
- Samir Zaoui (born 1976), Algerian football player and manager
- Samir Zard (born 1955), Lebanese-French chemist
- Samir Zazou (born 1980), Algerian footballer
- Samir Zekiqi (born 1995), Kosovan basketball player
- Samir Zeljković (born 1997), Bosnian footballer
- Samir Ziani (born 1990), French boxer
- Samir Zulič (born 1966), Slovenian footballer

== Fictional characters ==
- Samir Duran/Emil Narud, in the StarCraft series

== See also ==
- SAMEER, an autonomous research and development institution in India
- Samira, an Arabic feminine given name and a Sanskrit masculine given name
