= Tribalism =

State of being organized by, or advocating for, tribes or tribal lifestyles

Tribalism is the state of being organized by, or advocating for, tribes or tribal lifestyles. Human evolution primarily occurred in small hunter-gatherer groups, as opposed to in larger and more recently settled agricultural societies or civilizations. With a negative connotation and in a political context, tribalism can also mean discriminatory behavior or attitudes towards out-groups, based on in-group loyalty.

== Definition ==
The term "tribe" derives from the ancient Latin word "tribus" and can be defined to mean an extended kin group or clan with a common ancestor. A tribe can also be described as a group who share the common interest of mutual survival and preservation of a common culture. The proverb "birds of a feather flock together" describes homophily, the human tendency to form friendship networks with people of similar occupations, interests, and habits. Some tribes can be located in geographically proximate areas, like villages or bands, and although telecommunications in theory could enable groups of people to form tribe-like communities, digital tribes and social networking websites are not quite tribes in that they do not inherently provide the mutual survival of both the individual members of the tribe and for the tribe itself, as tribes do.

In terms of conformity, the word "tribalism" has been defined as a "subjectivity" or "way of being" social frame in which communities are bound socially beyond immediate birth ties by the dominance of various modalities of face-to-face and object integration. Ontologically, tribalism is oriented around the valences of analogy, genealogy and mythology. That means that customary tribes have their social foundations in some variation of these tribal orientations, while often taking on traditional practices (e.g. Abrahamic religions such as Christianity, Judaism, and Islam), and modern practices, including monetary exchange, mobile communications, and modern education.

Tribalism in a political sense refers to the strong political solidarity typical of post-truth politics.

== Social structure ==
The social structure of a tribe can vary greatly from case to case. The relatively small size of customary tribes results in a social life which usually involve a relatively few significant political or economic distinctions between individuals. As a result, social hierarchy is uncommon, and deep bonds are made between individual members.

A tribe often refers to itself using its own language's word for "people", and refers to other, neighboring tribes with various words to distinguish them as other. For example, the term "Inuit" translates to "people".

== Types ==
Tribalism implies the possession of a strong cultural or ethnic identity that separates one member of a group from the members of another group. Based on strong relations of proximity and kinship, as well as relations based on the mutual survival of both the individual members of the tribe and for the tribe itself, members of a tribe tend to possess a strong feeling of identity. Objectively, for a customary tribal society to form there needs to be ongoing customary organization, inquiry, and exchange. However, intense feelings of common identity can lead people to feel tribally connected.

The distinction between these two definitions of tribalism, objective and subjective, is an important one because while tribal societies have been pushed to the edges of the Western world, tribalism, by the second definition, is arguably undiminished. A few writers have postulated that the human brain is hard-wired towards tribalism, but that claim is usually linked to equating original questions of sociality with tribalism.

== Concept evolution ==
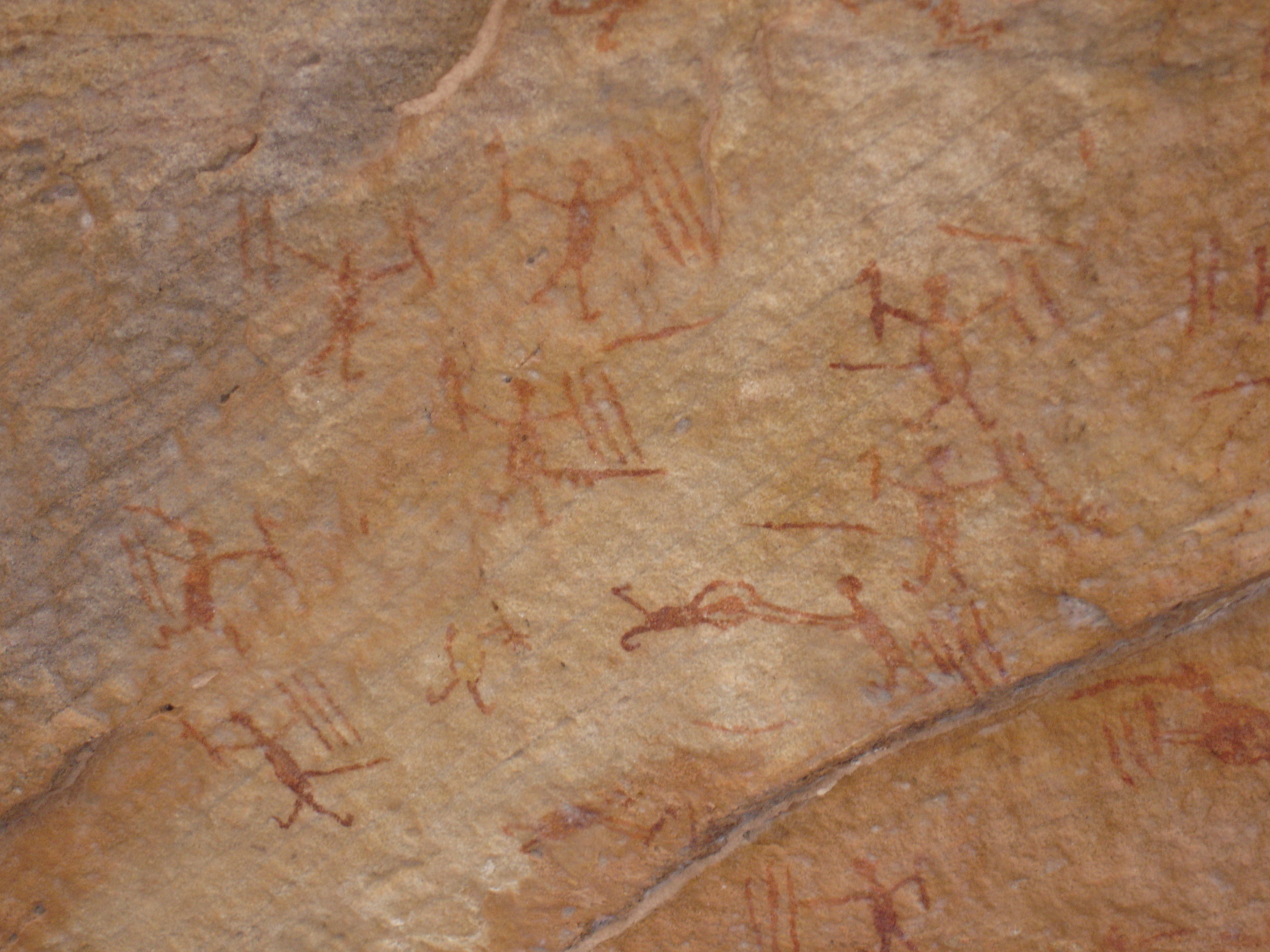
Tribalistic mentalities often lead to violence and war, as seen in cave paintings.

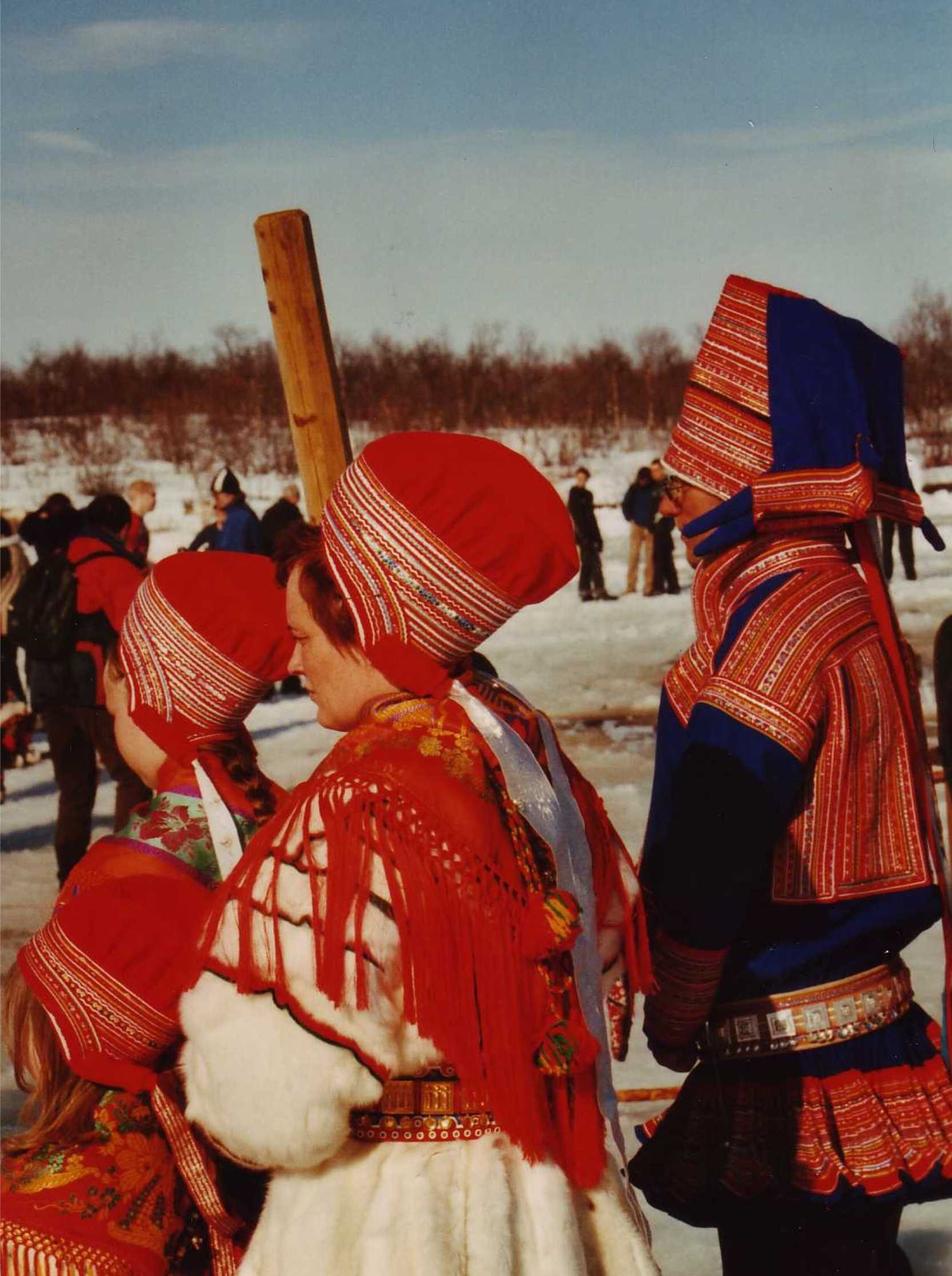
Pastoralist Sami celebrating Easter

Tribalism has a very adaptive effect in human evolution. Humans are social animals and ill-equipped to live on their own. Tribalism and social bonding help to keep individuals committed to the group, even when personal relations may fray. That keeps individuals from wandering off or joining other groups. It also leads to bullying when a tribal member is unwilling to conform to the politics of the collective.

Some scholars argue that inclusive fitness in humans involves kin selection and kin altruism, in which groups of an extended family with shared genes help others with similar genes, based on their coefficient of relationship (the amount of genes they have in common). Other scholars argue that fictive kinship is common in human organizations, allowing non-kin members to collaborate in groups like fraternities.

Socially, divisions between groups fosters specialized interactions with others, based on association: altruism (positive interactions with unrelated members), kin-selectivity (positive interactions with related members) and violence (negative interactions). Thus, groups with a strong sense of unity and identity can benefit from kin selection behaviour such as common property and shared resources. The tendencies of members to unite against an outside tribe and the ability to act violently and prejudicially against that outside tribe likely boosted the chances of survival in genocidal conflicts.

Modern examples of tribal genocide rarely reflect the defining characteristics of tribes existing prior to the Neolithic Revolution; for example, small population and close-relatedness.

According to a study by Robin Dunbar at the University of Liverpool, social group size is determined by primate brain size. Dunbar's conclusion was that most human brains can really understand only an average of 150 individuals as fully developed, complex people. That is known as Dunbar's number. In contrast, anthropologist H. Russell Bernard and Peter Killworth have done a variety of field studies in the United States that came up with an estimated mean number of ties, 290, roughly double Dunbar's estimate. The Bernard–Killworth median of 231 is lower because of upward straggle in the distribution, but it is still appreciably larger than Dunbar's estimate.

Canadian writer Malcolm Gladwell expanded on this conclusion sociologically in his book, The Tipping Point, where members of one of his types, Connectors, were successful by their larger-than-average number of close friendships and capacity for maintaining them, which tie together otherwise-unconnected social groups. According to such studies, then, "tribalism" is a hard-to-escape fact of human neurology simply because many human brains are not adapted to working with large populations. Once a person's limit for connection is reached, the human brain resorts to some combination of hierarchical schemes, stereotypes and other simplified models to understand so many people.

American cultural psychologist and leadership professor Michael W. Morris parses tribal influences into three factors in his book Tribal: How the Cultural Instincts That Divide Us Can Help Bring Us Together.The peer instinct relates to conformity, and how humans look to their classmates, peers, and neighbors for signals of behavior. The hero instinct relates to our upward fascination toward role models—celebrities, CEOs, and MVPs model the behavior some hope to emulate. The ancestor instinct relates to tradition and rituals, how humans find comfort in the old and their zeal to keep routines alive. Morris argues these instincts explain the successes and failures of companies, grassroots movements, and sports teams.

== Negative outcomes ==
Anthropologists engage in ongoing debate on the phenomenon of warfare among tribes. While fighting typically and certainly occurs among horticultural tribes, an open question remains whether such warfare is a typical feature of hunter-gatherer life or is an anomaly found only in certain circumstances, such as scarce resources (as with the Inuit or Arabs) or only among food-producing societies.

Certain tribes use forms of subsistence such as horticulture and foraging that cannot yield the same number of absolute calories as agriculture. Those subsistence methods thus limit those tribal populations significantly, especially when compared to agricultural populations. Jesse Mathis writes in War Before Civilization that examples exist with low percentage rates of casualties in tribal battle, and some tribal battles were much more lethal as a percentage of population than, for example, the Battle of Gettysburg. He concludes that no evidence consistently indicates that primitive battles are proportionately less lethal than civilized ones.

The realistic conflict theory is a model of intergroup conflict, arguing that in a real or perceived zero-sum system, conflicts arise over shared interests for finite resources. The 1954 Robbers Cave experiment involved researchers putting 12-year-old boys into groups, where they formed their own ingroups, before then developing hostility and negativity towards the other group during simulated conflict over finite resources in a zero-sum game.

== Criticism ==
Various authors, such as Aidan Southall, have attacked the notion of tribe as a tool of colonial ideology, and identified modern tribalism as a product of colonial governance in Africa. The Africa Policy Information Center describes the term, and tribalism in particular as a byword for ethnic strife, as invoking negative stereotypes of Africa as a land of primitive and territorial peoples.

An April, 2021 article published in the Journal of Hospital Medicine titled "Tribalism: The Good, The Bad, and The Future" by Zahir Kanjee and Leslie Bilello of Harvard Medical School was retracted due to protest from readers over the use of the terms tribe and tribalism. The article was then republished with the title "Leadership and Professional Development: Specialty Silos in Medicine" along with an apology from the editor-in-chief. The revised version of the article substituted the terms groups and medical specialties for tribes, and siloed and factional for tribalism.

Literature has consistently cautioned against treating intra-African conflicts as expressions of timeless “tribal” hatred. For instance, the Hutu–Tutsi identity, central to scholarship on the Rwandan 1994 genocide and the Rwandan Civil War of 1990–94, but researchers also examine colonial administration, political power, land, economic inequalities, state institutions and the political mobilisation of ethnicity. Research on peace negotiations has argued that attempts to resolve Burundi's crisis through an exclusive focus on ethnic identities fail to address the conflict's broader political and social dimensions.The Biafran War or Nigerian Civil War of 1967–70 is another conflict involving strong ethnic dimensions, particularly involving Igbo identity. However, scholarship correctly places these alongside questions of state power, regionalism, political representation, colonial legacies and economic interests. As such, identifying with a specific tribe can satisfy cultural and linguistic needs without letting political manipulation turn one tribe against another, and Aidan Southall criticiques this political move to divide and conquer.

Modern African fiction has shown that tribal identity can be understood as a matter of expression and philosophy rather than simply one of emotion. For instance, Ngũgĩ wa Thiong’o advocates for African novelists to write in their indigenous languages. He practises what he preaches by writing in Gĩkũyũ, while encouraging African writers more broadly to do the same in their own languages. In doing so, he presents language as an expression of cultural identity and as a means of challenging the hegemony of Western languages.

== See also ==
- Amity-enmity complex
- Anarcho-primitivism
- Chauvinism
- Clan
- Clique
- Cult
- Communitarianism
- Community
- Engaged theory
- Esprit de corps
- Ethnocentrism
- Fandom
- Gang
- Gang violence
- Groupthink
- Herd mentality
- Identitarianism
- Identity politics
- Ingroups and outgroups
- Jingoism
- Nationalism
- Neotribalism
- Partisanship
- Racism
- Religion
- Sectarianism
- Sports violence
- Tribe
- Xenophobia
