= Abdellaoui =

Abdellaoui is a surname. Notable people with the surname include:

- Ayoub Abdellaoui (born 1993), Algerian footballer
- Cherine Abdellaoui (born 1998), Algerian judoka
- Samir Abdellaoui (born 1980), Tunisian politician
- Yassine Abdellaoui (born 1975), Dutch footballer
