= Hugo Eckener =

Manager of the Luftschiffbau Zeppelin company (1868–1954)

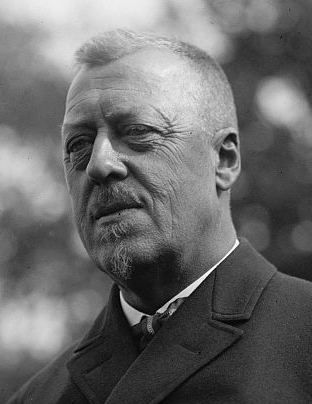
- Hugo Eckener in 1924
- Born: Hugo Eckener; 10 August 1868; Flensburg, North German Confederation
- Died: 14 August 1954 (aged 86); Friedrichshafen, West Germany
- Monuments: Hugo-Eckener-Schule, Hugo-Eckener-Saal (both Friedrichshafen)
- Known for: Airship designer, pilot, company manager
- Spouse: Johanna Maaß (1871–1956)
- Relatives: Alexander Eckener (brother)
- Aviation career
- First flight: 16 May 1911; LZ 8, Deutschland II
- Famous flights: 1928 first intercontinental passenger airship flight, 1929 flight around the world (the only such flight by an airship, and the second by an aircraft of any type) and 1931 Arctic flight
- Flight license: 1911

Hugo Eckener (German pronunciation: [ˈhuːɡo ˈɛkənɐ]; 10 August 1868 – 14 August 1954) was the manager of Luftschiffbau Zeppelin during the inter-war years, and also the commander of the famous Graf Zeppelin for most of its record-setting flights, including the first airship flight around the world, making him the most successful airship commander in history. He was also responsible for the construction of the most successful type of airships of all time. An anti-Nazi who was invited to campaign as a moderate in the German presidential elections, he was blacklisted by the Nazi regime and eventually sidelined.

== Background ==
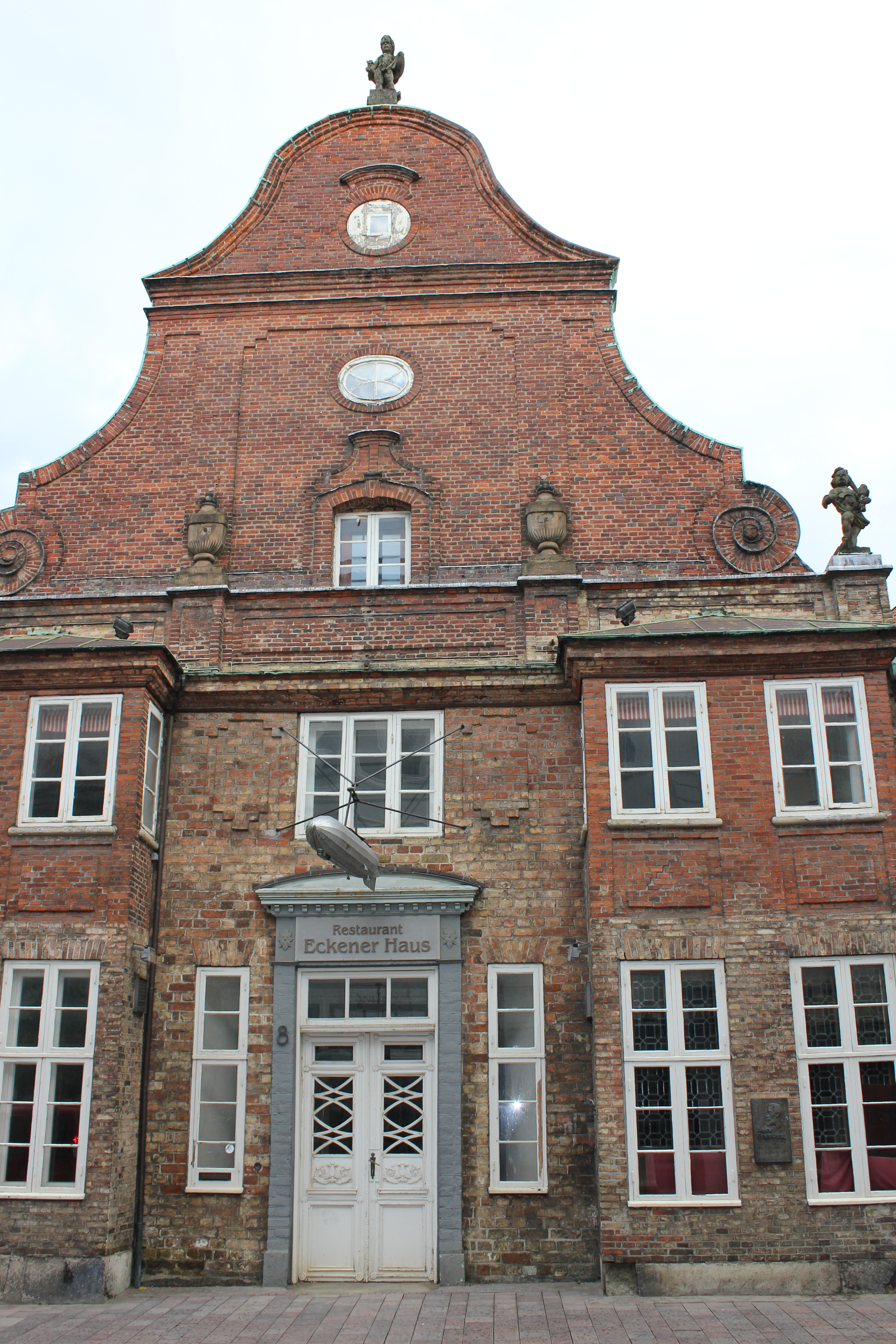
Birth house

Eckener was born in Flensburg as the first child of Johann Christoph Eckener from Bremen and Anna Lange, daughter of a shoemaker. As a youth he was judged an "indifferent student", and he spent summers sailing and winters ice skating.

Nevertheless, by 1892 under Professor Wilhelm Wundt, Eckener had earned a doctorate "magna cum laude" in what today might be deemed experimental psychology at Leipzig University.

Eckener then began his military service in the Infantry Regiment 86 in Flensburg.

Eckener's early career was as a journalist and editor; by August 1893 he was working for the Flensburger Nachrichten; in October 1897 he married Johanna, daughter of the publisher family Maaß. He later became a correspondent for the Frankfurter Zeitung in 1905 and 1906, whilst writing a book on the social effects of capitalism.

== Pre-war airship activities ==
Asked to cover the first flights of the Zeppelins LZ 1 and LZ 2, Eckener was critical of both airships' marginal performances, but praised Count Ferdinand von Zeppelin's dedication to his cause. Because several scientists and engineers had criticized his airship plans, the Count sought to speak to Eckener. Eckener was so impressed by him that during October 1908 he agreed to be a part-time publicist for the Zeppelin Company. He became extremely interested in airships, and joined the company on a full-time basis.

His aptitude at flying was noticed early on in his career, and he became an airship captain, obtaining his airship license in 1911. However, when Eckener attempted his first flight on 16 May 1911 in the LZ 8, christened Deutschland II, he decided to launch it in a strong wind, which pushed the craft into the hangar wall, damaging it seriously. Nonetheless, he became a very successful airshipman.

== World War I ==
Eckener was responsible for training most of Germany's airship pilots both during and after World War I. Despite his protestations, he was not allowed on operational missions due to his value as an instructor.

== Head of the Zeppelin Company ==
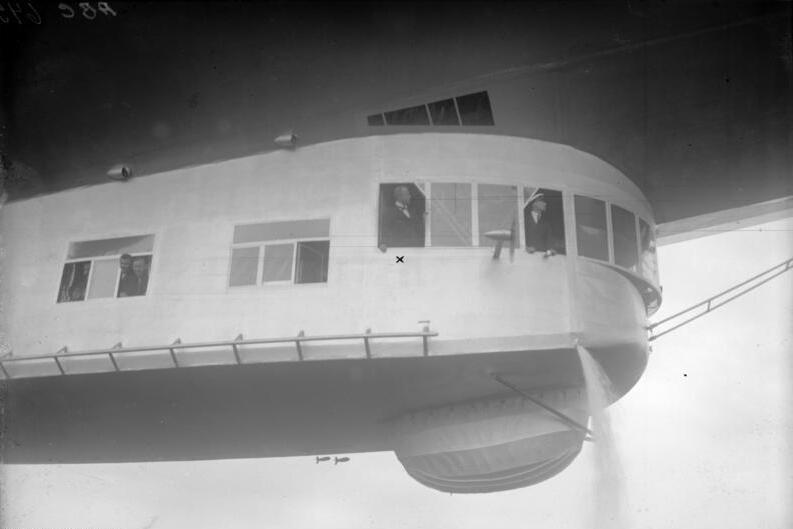
Eckener (marked with an x) test flying the LZ 126 in August before delivery to the United States in October 1924

After the War, Eckener succeeded Count Ferdinand von Zeppelin, who had died on 8 March 1917. After considerable conflict with Zeppelin's business manager, Alfred Colsman, who wanted to replace the production of airships with production of other (and likely more profitable) products, Eckener was able to keep the Zeppelin factory at Friedrichshafen on Bodensee (Lake Constance) in Württemberg, southern Germany, from being retooled. Colsman left the company soon afterwards.

Under the Treaty of Versailles, Germany was forbidden to construct airships of the size needed to operate the profitable trans-Atlantic service that was Eckener's goal. However, after much skillful lobbying, Eckener persuaded the U.S. and German governments to allow the company to build LZ 126, later rechristened the USS Los Angeles (ZR-3), for the United States Navy as part of Germany's war reparations. In 1924, Eckener commanded the zeppelin on its delivery flight to Lakehurst, New Jersey. The Los Angeles became the longest-serving rigid airship ever operated by the United States Navy.

== The golden age of the rigid airship ==
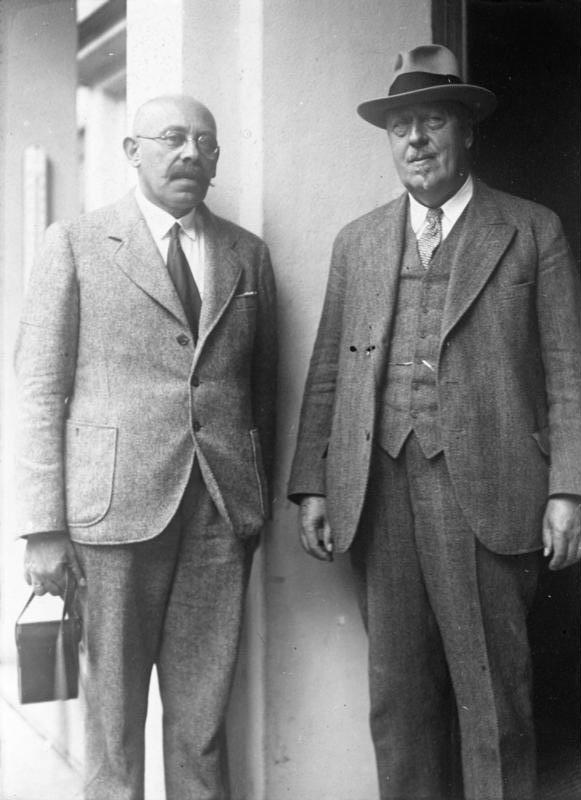
Russian polar researcher Rudolf Lazarevich Samoylovich (left) prior to leading the Graf Zeppelin's scientific polar flight, with Eckener in Friedrichshafen, July 1931

Refused funds by the penniless Weimar government, Eckener and his colleagues began a nationwide fund-raising lecture tour in order to commence construction of Graf Zeppelin, which became the most successful rigid airship ever built.

The first flight to America was fraught with drama. Near Bermuda on the outbound flight the airship was nearly lost after becoming caught in a severe storm during which fabric was ripped off the left fin. The ship was saved only by Eckener's skilled piloting and the courage of his son, Knut Eckener, and other crew members who climbed out onto the fin to repair the damage. Upon arrival in America, a country which Eckener grew to love, he and the crew were subject to the first of two New York ticker tape parades.

Eckener captained Graf Zeppelin during most of its record-setting flights, including the 1928 first intercontinental passenger airship flight, the 1929 flight around the world (the only such flight by an airship, and the second by an aircraft of any type) and the 1931 Arctic flight.

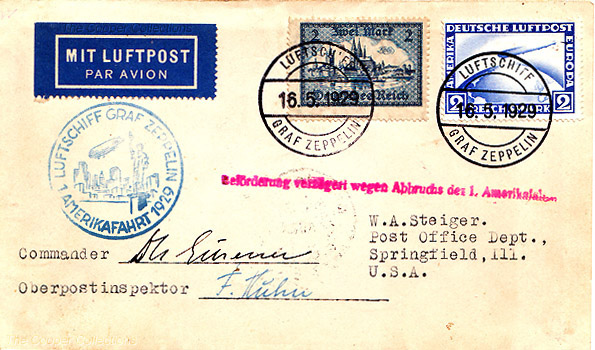
Cover autographed by Eckener flown on the nearly disastrous "Interrupted Flight" in May/August 1929

A master of publicity as well as a master airship captain, Eckener used the Graf Zeppelin to establish the Zeppelin as a symbol of German pride and engineering.

After these flights the public treated Eckener as a national hero. During the early 1930s, Eckener was one of the most well-known and respected figures in Weimar Republic Germany. In the 1932 presidential election Eckener was a potential unity candidate against Adolf Hitler, encouraged to campaign by leaders of both the SPD and the Zentrum, but he bowed out when Paul von Hindenburg decided to run for a second term. However, his potential candidacy had already angered the Nazi Party. In supposed anger and fear of Eckener, Hitler's de facto deputy, Hermann Esser, once called him the "director of the flying Weisswurst", a greyish-white Bavarian sausage.

== Sidelined ==
The Nazis came to power in January 1933. A planned arrest of Eckener in 1933 was blocked by Hindenburg. Hitler met Eckener only once, in July 1933, but the two barely spoke. Eckener did not make any secret of his dislike of the Nazis and the disastrous events he foresaw. He criticised the regime frequently, and refused to allow the Nazis to use the large hangars at Frankfurt for a rally. Eventually the Nazis declared Eckener to be persona non grata and his name was no longer allowed to appear in print.

During the 1930s, the Nazi government nationalized the Zeppelin operation under the name Deutsche Zeppelin-Reederei GmbH (DZR). The Nazis sidelined Eckener in favour of men who were more compliant with their wishes. In their haste to please the Nazi regime, these newly promoted airshipmen did not always obey Eckener's safety procedures. For example, the maiden voyage of the Hindenburg nearly resulted in disaster when Captain Ernst A. Lehmann brought the ship out in strong winds in order to undertake a Nazi propaganda flight. The ship was damaged, and there was an argument between Eckener, Lehmann and the Nazi propaganda ministry.

Hugo Eckener had always made safety his absolute priority during his many years managing airship operations. With Eckener's management, the Zeppelin company had a perfect safety record with no passenger ever sustaining a serious injury on any of the more than 1 million air miles that the rigid airships flew, until the Hindenburg disaster of 1937. Eckener was in Graz, Austria when he heard news of the Hindenburg disaster on 6 May 1937. In the official inquiry he concluded that a static spark ignited leaking hydrogen in the aft section of the ship. The leak would have been caused by a sharp turn, which he believed overstrained a bracing wire, causing it to snap and rip open an adjacent gas cell.

After the destruction of the Hindenburg, the nearly-completed LZ-130 Graf Zeppelin II was redesigned as a helium-filled ship, although, owing to geo-political considerations, the helium extracted from natural gas in the USA was not available. Thus the ship never began commercial service. However, under the command of Captain Albert Sammt, who had previously survived the fiery destruction of the Hindenburg, albeit with severe burns, the ship performed an espionage mission off the coast of Great Britain, intended to investigate the radar defences. Eckener, however, had by this time little influence on the Zeppelin Company.

== After World War II ==
Eckener survived World War II despite his disagreements with the Nazis. Post-war, he was involved in a plan by the Goodyear Zeppelin Corporation to build large rigid airships, but the project came to nothing.

In 1945, Johannes Weyl and Eckener co-founded the Südkurier regional newspaper and Eckener started writing for German-French co-operation. In November 1945 Eckener was confronted with the charge of collaboration with Nazi Germany. In 1947 the French occupying powers fined him 100,000 ℛ︁ℳ︁. Many personalities lobbied for Eckener's rehabilitation. The judgement was rejected in July 1948 and Eckener was rehabilitated.

Eckener's home town of Flensburg had a Danish-oriented majority in its council since 1945, with the goal of unification with Denmark. Eckener remained active in local politics campaigning for a German majority in Flensburg, while at the same time, during a "thundering" one-hour speech in 1951, warning against small-mindedness in border concerns.

Hugo Eckener died in Friedrichshafen on 14 August 1954, four days after his 86th birthday.

== Legacy ==
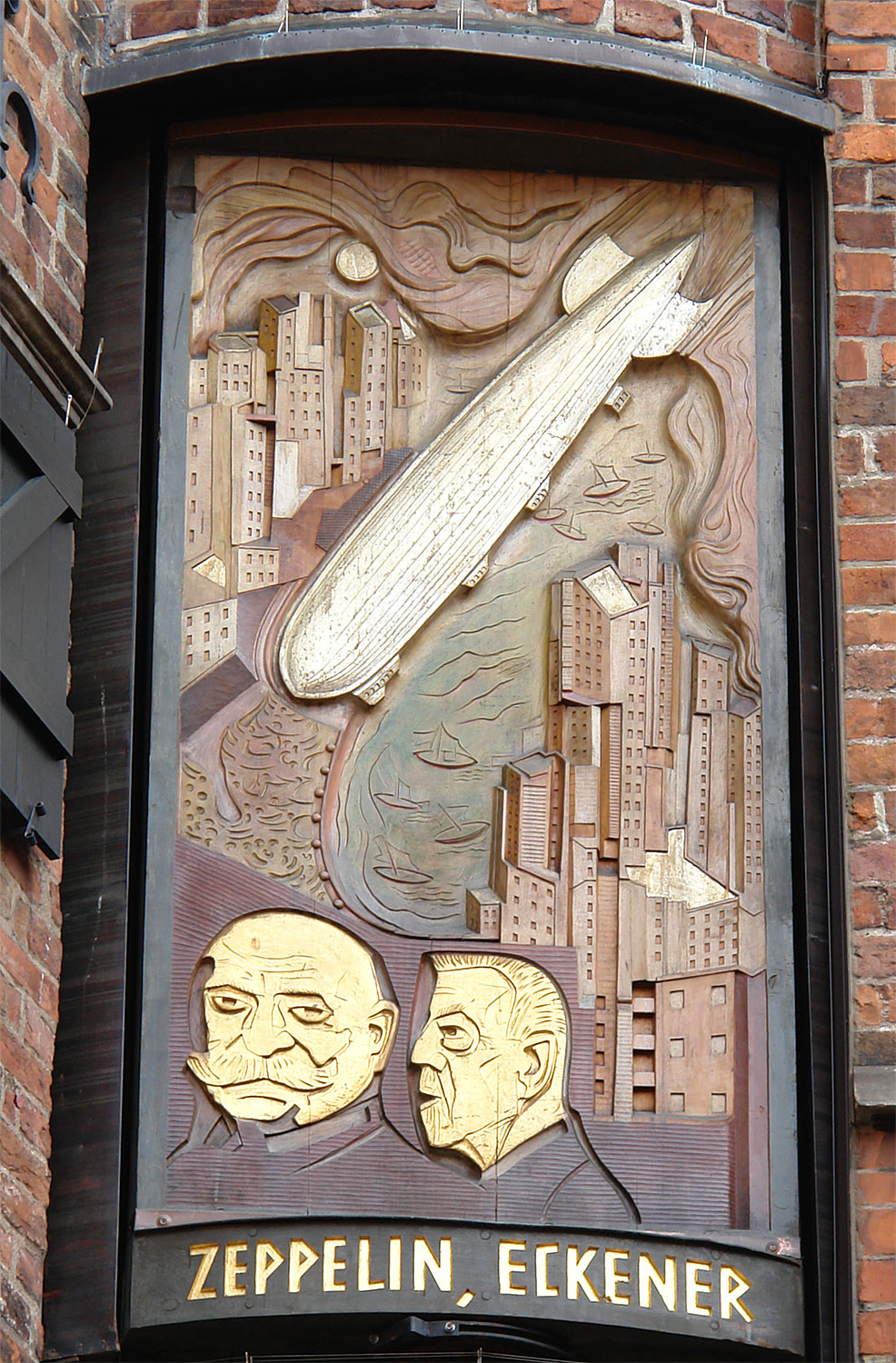
The Glockenspiel House in Bremen's Böttcherstraße displays this panel as part of 10 from Bernhard Hoetger's 1934 "ocean-crossing" set.

Eckener was responsible for many innovative aviation developments, notably the trans-Atlantic passenger services offered by the airships Graf Zeppelin and Hindenburg.

Since his death his achievements have been remembered by airship enthusiasts and historians. Additionally, the town of Friedrichshafen, scene of his many triumphant homecomings in Graf Zeppelin, has recognised his memory by naming a large new conference centre after him.

== Bibliography ==
Eckener wrote or contributed to 24 publications, including two books in English:

Eckener, Hugo: Count Zeppelin. The Man and his Work. London: Massie Publishing Company, Ltd. 1938.
Eckener, Hugo: My Zeppelins. London: Putnam 1958.

== In popular culture ==
Eckener features as a character in the 2004 short story "The Eckener Alternative" by James L. Cambias, the 2012 novel Flight from Berlin by David John, and in the novels Vango: Between Sky and Earth (2010) and "A Prince Without Kingdom" (2011) by Timothée de Fombelle. Eckener also appears as a character in the 2018 novel 'Beneath Gray Skies', by Hugh Ashton.

Eckener features as a character in the crime novel, The Good Nazi, by Samir Machado de Machado, translated into English in 2025.

== See also ==
- List of Zeppelins
- List of covers of Time magazine (1920s)
