= Südkurier =

Regional daily newspaper in Germany

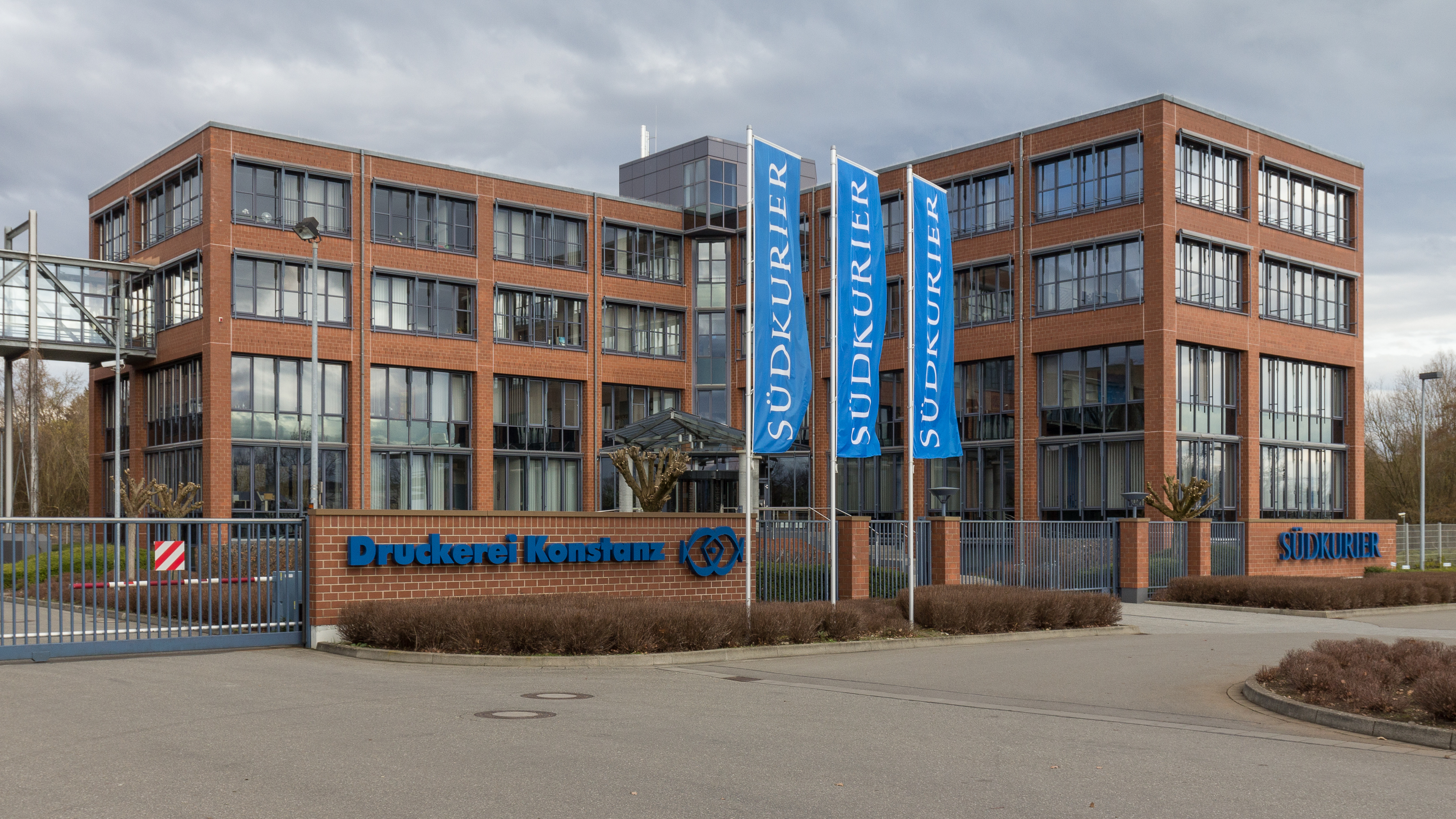
- Type: Regional daily newspaper (not Sundays)
- Founder(s): Johannes Weyl, Hugo Eckener
- Publisher: Gesellschafter der Südkurier GmbH
- Editor: Stefan Lutz (since 2010)
- Founded: 8 September 1945
- Language: German
- Headquarters: Konstanz, Germany
- Circulation: 111.444 Exemplare (IVW 1/2020, Mo–Sa)
- Website: suedkurier.de

The Südkurier is a regional daily newspaper in Germany serving the regions northwest of Lake Constance, Hochrhein and Black Forest with its headquarters in Konstanz. The paper appears with a circulation of around 130,000, six times per week, in Berliner format (since 1 March 2010; hitherto in Rhine Format). The predecessor of the Südkurier was the Konstanzer Zeitung.

== Sources ==
- Konstanzer Zeitung 1728–1928. Jubiläumsbeilage zum 200-jährigen Bestehen in 14 Teilen mit vielen Abbildungen. Konstanz: Konstanzer Zeitung [Reuß & Itta], Oktober 1928, 112 S. (als Sonderbeilage erschienene Jubiläumsausgabe mit Artikeln zur Geschichte der Zeitung, ihrer Herstellung und zur Bedeutung der Regionalpresse usw.)
- Johannes Weyl: Aufbau von innen. Aufsätze; Teile einer Rede zum 10-jährigen Bestehen des Südkurier. Konstanz: Druckerei und Verlagsanstalt am Fischmarkt, 1956, 38 S.
- Walter Manggold (Hrsg.): Oberländer Chronik. Heft 1960: Heimatblätter des Südkurier. Konstanz: Universitäts-Druckerei, 1960, 100 S.
- Georg Bräunig: 300 Jahre Zeitung in Oberbaden. Konstanz: Südkurier, 1965, 32 S.
- Johannes Weyl: Unterwanderung der Presse. Die Auseinandersetzung Tageszeitungen, Anzeigenblätter. Vortrag. Bad Godesberg: Bundesverband Deutscher Zeitungsverleger e. V., 1968, 6 Bl.
- Nikolaus Benckiser (Hrsg.): Zeitungen in Deutschland. 56 Portraits von deutschen Tageszeitungen dargeboten von der FAZ. Frankfurt am Main, 1969, 120 S. (Bericht über 56 Zeitungen der Nachkriegsjahre von der "Badischen Zeitung" bis zum "Südkurier" und der "Leipziger Zeitung")
- Waldemar Besson: Erlebte Zeitgeschichte kritisch betrachtet. Eine Festgabe zum 25jährigen Bestehen des Südkurier. 44 Stücke politischer Publizistik. [Redaktion u. Illustration: Herbert Steinert. Einleitungsbemerkungen zu den Aufsätzen: Klaus Peter Werner]. Konstanz: Verlag des Südkurier, 1970 198 S., ISBN 3-87799-001-0
- Walter Manggold: Aus der Gründungszeit des Südkurier. Erinnerungen von Mitarbeitern [Zusammenstellung der Texte: Walter Manggold]. [Konstanz]: [Südkurier, Buchverlag], [1977]. 52 S.
- Johannes Weyl: Aus 50 Jahren Zeitungsarbeit. Aufsätze, Reden, Bilder u. Dokumente. Konstanz: Verlag des Südkurier, 1976, 223 S.
- Eva Henneberg: Über die Zeitung. Äußerungen von Verlags-Gesellschaftern und Chefredakteuren des Südkurier zu Pressefragen. 2., erw. Auflage. Konstanz: Südkurier, 1978. 23 S.
- Franz Oexle: Wohin führt die Reise? Wegbeschreibungen. Ein Querschnitt von 1966 bis 1982. Konstanz: Verlag des Südkurier, 1982, 119 S., ISBN 3-87799-037-1
- Gerd Appenzeller unter anderem: Südkurier. Bilder und Zahlen, 7. Auflage, Konstanz 1985, 30 Blatt
- Michael Geigges: Die Deutsche Bodensee-Zeitung. Versuch einer katholischen Tageszeitung, im Dritten Reich zu überleben. Konstanz: Südkurier, 1986. 230 S., ISBN 3-87799-063-0
- Sebastian Dix: Südkurier 1945–1952; bewegte Anfangsjahre einer Regionalzeitung. Konstanz: UVK, Universitäts-Verlag Konstanz, 1995, 144 S., ISBN 3-87940-553-0
- Werner Schwarzwälder, Tobias Engelsing: Zeitbilder, Momentaufnahmen aus 50 Jahren. Das Südkurier-Jubiläumsbuch für Bodensee, Schwarzwald und Hochrhein, 1945–1995. Konstanz: Südkurier, 1995, 203 Seiten
- Patrick Eich: "Dekaden unter der Lupe – Empirische Untersuchung zur Entwicklung und Veränderung des Hauptsports im Südkurier von 1945 bis 2002", Dissertation, Universität Konstanz, 2005, 429 S.
- Manfred Bosch: Zeit der schönen Not. Die Anfangsjahre des Südverlag in Konstanz 1945 bis 1952. Konstanz: UVK Verlagsgesellschaft, 2009, 432 S., ISBN 978-3-86764-062-6

== See also ==
- List of German newspapers
