= Orient Research Centre =

Dubai-based think tank

- Orient Research Centre's logo
- Formation: 2011
- Type: Decision Making Support Think Tank
- Headquarters: Dubai, United Arab Emirates.
- Location: Jumeirah Lakes Towers, Dubai, United Arab Emirates
- General Director: Samir Altaqi
- Website: http://www.orientresearchcentre.com/

The Orient Research Centre (ORC) is a think tank based in Dubai that focuses on risks and geopolitical issues in the Persian Gulf and the MENA region.

== Background ==
ORC was first established in Syria as a decision-making support platform that worked for the Syrian government, then it was closed due to political reasons in 2010. Later in mid-2011, it was formed in the heart of the United Arab Emirates to support agencies and governments in the decision-making phase. The centre rarely publishes its researches due to confidentiality reasons. However, there are many blogs and other sister-centers through which it releases publications, such as the Middle East Briefing, Ixyria and many others.

The Orient Research Centre's slogan is THINK ARABIC, and in other words those who conduct researches for ORC are Arabs and they give their point of view of what's happening around the world as Arabs. ORC holds from five to eight closed seminars per year in which the subject varies depending on the needs of the political momentum. It also relies on conducting internal workshops and brainstorming sessions to analyse to understand and to predict to prevent.

== Current programs ==
The Orient Research Center works on the following research programs:

- Program on the Gulf Cooperation Council nations (Saudi Arabia, United Arab Emirates, Yemen).
- Program on the Arab Neighborhood of the Middle East (Iraq, Egypt, Syria, and Lebanon).
- Program on the Regional Neighborhood of the Middle East (Turkey, Iran and Israel).
- Program on the Relevant Political and Economic International Environment concerning the region (United States of America, Russia, Germany, France and the United Kingdom).

== Publications ==
ORC publishes several types of research results and policy papers such as the Political Spectrum, Weekly Report, Tahawulate, and other confidential monthly reports and annual yearbooks.

=== Political Spectrum ===
A daily informative and analytical report published in Arabic. It monitors all the research studies, policy papers and reports of other research centers and international and regional newspapers, and presents them in a compact analytical summary.

=== Weekly report ===
A weekly private report that covers the most important news and events to analyse the momentum and their aftermaths on the Arab states of the Persian Gulf and the MENA region.

=== Tahawulat ===
A weekly Arabic publication created by ORC and IAG that covers and analyses the most important news internationally.

=== Oil and Gas Briefing ===
A semi-monthly English publication created by IAG that covers and analyses the most important news in regards to the oil and gas industry internationally.

== Internship programs ==
Yearly, the Centre offers an opportunity for political science students and scholars to get involved and work with ORC experts and researchers on topics related to and in cooperation with relevant organisations and accredited institutions.

== ORC globally ==
The Orient Research Centre headquarter is in Dubai, United Arab Emirates. The centre has two other branches in Gaziantep, Turkey, and in Washington, D.C., United States.
