= Al-Khaleej FC =

Sport club in Saudi Arabia

Khaleej Club
- Full name: Khaleej Club
- Nicknames: Al-Danah (The Pearls); Al-Nusoor (The Eagles)
- Founded: 1945; 81 years ago
- Ground: Prince Nayef Sports City Stadium; Qatif, Saudi Arabia
- Capacity: 12,000
- Owner: Ministry of Sport
- Chairman: Alaa Al-Hamal
- Head coach: José Gomes
- League: Saudi Pro League
- 2025–26: Pro League, 12th of 18
- Website: khaleejclub.sa
Home colours	Away colours

Khaleej Club (Arabic: نادي الخليج, lit. 'Gulf Club'), better known as Al-Khaleej FC, is a Saudi Arabian professional football and multi-sport club based in Saihat, in the Eastern Province, that competes in the Saudi Pro League, the top tier of the Saudi football league system.

== History ==
The club was founded in 1945, under the name "Al-Nasr Club" (meaning "Eagle") with its yellow and black emblem. It was officially recognized as one of the clubs of the Eastern Province in 1968. Later, its name was changed to "Al-Khaleej Club" with a yellow and green emblem by order of King Faisal.

== Ground ==
Al-Khaleej is a football club based in Saihat, a city in the Qatif Governorate of Saudi Arabia’s Eastern Province. Over the years, the club has played its home matches at various venues, including Prince Nayef Sports City Stadium in Qatif and Prince Mohamed bin Fahd Stadium in Dammam. In 2024, it was announced that the club’s old training ground would be redeveloped into a modern football stadium (Al-Khaleej Club Stadium). This development will finally allow Al-Khaleej to play its home games in its own city.

== Coaching staff ==
- Head coach: José Gomes
- Assistant coach: Octávio Moreira, Nuno Ferreira, André Bikey
- Goalkeeper coach: Luís Vicente Castro Gomes, Bander Al-Awwad
- Fitness coach: Panagiotis Voulgaris
- Match analysis: Abdulaziz Al-Bakr
- Sporting director: Constantin Pană
- Doctor: Abdulelah Al-Marzouq
- Physiotherapist: Nawaf Al-Dossari
- Technical director: Hussain Hawsawi

=== Managerial history ===
- (Netherlands) Arie Stehouwer (1980)
- (Netherlands) Hans Venneker (1980 – 1981)
- (Egypt) Hamadah El Menshawy (1983 – 1989)
- (Egypt) Zaki Osman (1990 – 1991)
- (Tunisia) Ahmad Al-Ajlani (1997 – 1999)
- (Saudi Arabia) Khaled Al-Marzouq (May 1, 1999 – October 11, 1999)
- (Algeria) Abdelkrim Bira (October 11, 1999 – March 1, 2000)
- (Bulgaria) Angel (July 6, 2000 – March 1, 2001)
- (Saudi Arabia) Khaled Al-Marzouq (March 1, 2001 – June 1, 2004)
- (Tunisia) Yousef Al Suryati (August 9, 2004 – February 7, 2005)
- (Saudi Arabia) Khaled Al-Marzouq (February 7, 2005 – October 31, 2006)
- (Czech Republic) Jan Kmoch (caretaker) (October 31, 2006 – January 8, 2007)
- (Tunisia) Lotfi Benzarti (January 8, 2007 – May 20, 2007)
- (Portugal) Ricardo Formosinho (August 3, 2007 – November 4, 2007)
- (Saudi Arabia) Khaled Al-Marzouq (November 4, 2007 – May 30, 2008)
- (Tunisia) Samir Sellimi (June 23, 2008 – November 17, 2008)
- (Saudi Arabia) Sameer Hilal (November 17, 2008 – May 31, 2009)
- (Saudi Arabia) Khaled Al-Marzouq (June 8, 2009 – May 1, 2010)
- (Netherlands) Eelco Schattorie (July 27, 2010 – January 5, 2011)
- (Tunisia) Abderrazek Chebbi (January 5, 2011 – May 16, 2011)
- (Egypt) Ahmed El Agouz (July 29, 2011 – November 5, 2011)
- (Saudi Arabia) Khaled Al-Marzouq (November 5, 2011 – May 30, 2012)
- (Egypt) Ayman Ragab (July 1, 2012 – May 24, 2013)
- (Saudi Arabia) Sameer Hilal (May 28, 2013 – April 6, 2014)
- (Tunisia) Jalel Kadri (April 29, 2014 – May 30, 2016)
- (Belgium) Patrick De Wilde (June 9, 2016 – August 30, 2016)
- (Tunisia) Jalel Kadri (August 30, 2016 – May 5, 2017)
- (Romania) Eusebiu Tudor (May 18, 2017 – January 6, 2018)
- (Kuwait) Maher Al-Shammari (January 6, 2018 – May 1, 2018)
- (Saudi Arabia) Sameer Hilal (May 27, 2018 – June 1, 2019)
- (Croatia) Alen Horvat (July 7, 2019 – December 14, 2019)
- (Tunisia) Mohammed Tlemceni (caretaker) (December 14, 2019 – January 1, 2020)
- (Algeria) Kheïreddine Madoui (January 9, 2020 – September 20, 2020)
- (Saudi Arabia) Sameer Hilal (September 23, 2020 – June 1, 2021)
- (Serbia) Dejan Arsov (July 13, 2021 – November 23, 2021)
- (Portugal) Paulo Gomes (November 23, 2021 – May 6, 2022)
- (Saudi Arabia) Khaled Al-Marzouq (caretaker) (May 6, 2022 – June 1, 2022)
- (Portugal) Pedro Emanuel (July 3, 2022 – June 23, 2024)
- (Greece) Georgios Donis (July 11, 2024 – April 23, 2026)
- (Uruguay) Gus Poyet (April 23, 2026 – May 28, 2026)
- (Portugal) José Gomes (May 28, 2026 – present)

== Players ==
Note: Flags indicate national team as defined under FIFA eligibility rules; some limited exceptions apply. Players may hold more than one non-FIFA nationality.

No.	Pos.	Nation	Player
1	GK	KSA	Mohammed Al Ibrahim
2	DF	KSA	Hamad Al-Jayzani
3	DF	KSA	Mohammed Al-Khabrani
4	DF	GUI	Kiki Kouyaté
5	DF	POR	Pedro Rebocho
7	FW	NOR	Joshua King
8	MF	GEQ	Omar Mascarell
9	FW	ARG	Mateo Benegas (on loan from Ferro)
10	MF	NCL	Angelo Fulgini
11	MF	KSA	Saleh Al-Amri
12	MF	KSA	Majed Kanabah
13	DF	KSA	Ahmed Assiri
14	DF	KSA	Ali Al-Shaafi
15	MF	KSA	Mansour Hamzi
16	MF	KSA	Bader Munshi
17	DF	KSA	Abdullah Al-Hafith
18	MF	KSA	Nawaf Al-Sadi
19	MF	POR	Miguel Crespo

No.	Pos.	Nation	Player
20	FW	CPV	Witcha
23	MF	KSA	Rakan Al-Kaabi
25	DF	KSA	Hamed Al-Zahri
24	MF	KSA	Ali Abdulrouf
27	DF	KSA	Fawaz Al-Sqoor (on loan from Al-Ittihad)
28	MF	KSA	Hussain Al-Eisa
29	DF	KSA	Raed Al-Shanqiti
31	GK	KSA	Mohammed Al-Ghanem
39	DF	KSA	Saeed Al Hamsal
49	GK	LUX	Anthony Moris
78	MF	KSA	Faisal Al-Bakr
88	MF	GAM	Abdoulie Mboge
90	FW	KSA	Thamer Al-Khaibari (on loan from Neom)
92	FW	KSA	Abdulmajeed Al-Khathami
96	GK	KSA	Marwan Al-Haidari
97	MF	KSA	Fahad Al-Rashidi (on loan from Al-Taawoun)
99	FW	GAM	Musa Barrow
—	DF	KSA	Abdullah Al-Ammar

=== Out on loan ===
Note: Flags indicate national team as defined under FIFA eligibility rules; some limited exceptions apply. Players may hold more than one non-FIFA nationality.

No.	Pos.	Nation	Player
71	FW	KSA	Hussain Al-Sultan (at Al-Jabalain)

== Honours ==
- Saudi First Division League
  - Winners (2): 2005–06, 2021–22
  - Runners-up (2): 2002–03, 2013–14
- Prince Faisal bin Fahd Cup for Division 1 and 2 Teams
  - Winners (1): 1999–00
  - Runners-up (1): 2008–09

== Handball ==
The handball team is one of the most successful clubs in Saudi Arabia, having won the league title 10 times.

=== Partners ===
Laser Erima

=== Honours ===
Asian Club League Handball Championship

- Winners (1): 2023-2024 Asian Club League Handball Championship

IHF Men's Super Globe

- 2022: 6th out of 12
- 2023: 6th out of 12
- 2024: 5th out of 12

Arab Handball Championship of Champions

- Winners (2): 2002, 2007
- Runners-up (4): 1983, 1984, 1985, 1995

Saudi Handball League

- Winners (10): 1981–82, 1982–83, 1983–84, 1984–85, 1987–88, 1992–93, 1993–94, 1997–98, 2000–01, 2022–23, 2023–24
- Runners-up (Since 2005): 2005–06, 2014–15, 2015–16, 2018–19, 2019–20, 2021–22

Saudi Handball Federation Cup

- Winners (9): 1994, 1995, 1998, 1999, 2001, 2004, 2022, 2023, 2024
- Runners-up(12): 1982, 1983, 1986, 1987, 1990, 1992, 1997, 2009, 2010, 2014, 2017, 2021

Saudi Handball Elite Championship

- Runners-up (4): 2003, 2005, 2015, 2019

Saudi Handball Super Cup

- Winners (2): 2023, 2024

Saudi Handball Olympic Games

- Winners (2): 2022, 2023

Saudi Beach Handball Championship

- Runners-up (1): 2022

=== Current squad ===
Squad for the 2024–25 season

Head coach: (Greece) Dimitris Dimitroulias

Goalkeepers

- 12 (Saudi Arabia) Abdullah Alabdalali
- 16 (Saudi Arabia) Mohammad Al-Salem
- 33 (Saudi Arabia) Hussain Al-Mohsen

Left wingers

- 2 (Saudi Arabia) Mohamed Al Meskeen
- 4 (Saudi Arabia) Hassan Al Mubarak

Right wingers

- 7 (Saudi Arabia) Mohammed Al Meskeen
- 59 (Saudi Arabia) Hassan Al-Turaiki

Line players

- 3 (Saudi Arabia) Ali Al-Ibrahim
- 5 (Saudi Arabia) Jawad Jaffal
- 77 (Saudi Arabia) Marhoon Al-Maa
- 87 (Saudi Arabia) Jawad Al Ghafli

Left backs

- 31 (Serbia) Nemanja Mladenović
- 78 (Saudi Arabia) Hassan Al Ibrahim
- 94 (Qatar) Ameen Zakkar

Centre backs

- 1 (Saudi Arabia) Sadiq Al-Mohsin
- 10 (Saudi Arabia) Jehad Al Saihati
- 11 (Saudi Arabia) Sajad Al Shuwaikhat
- 13 (Serbia) Petar Nenadić (Joined for the 2023 IHF Men's Super Globe & 26th Asian Club League Handball Championship)
- 23 (Saudi Arabia) Mohammed Hani Al Basha
- 34 (Saudi Arabia) Mansour Al Saihati

Right backs

- 19 (Japan) Shinnosuke Tokuda (Joined for the 2023 IHF Men's Super Globe & 26th Asian Club League Handball Championship)
- 66 (Saudi Arabia) Rami Al Mutairi

== See also ==
- List of football clubs in Saudi Arabia
