= Sameer Hilal =

Saudi Arabian footballer and manager

Personal information
- Full name: Sameer Sulaiman Hilal
- Date of birth: 1967 (age 58–59)
- Place of birth: Dammam, Saudi Arabia
- Position: Midfielder

Youth career
- Al-Ettifaq

Senior career*
| Years | Team | Apps | (Gls) |
| 1986–2001 | Al-Ettifaq | | |
| 2001–2002 | Al-Khaleej | | |

Managerial career
- 2002–2005: Al-Ettifaq U18 (assistant)
- 2003: Al-Ettifaq (assistant)
- 2005: Al-Ettifaq U18
- 2005–2007: Al-Ettifaq U23 (assistant)
- 2007–2008: Al-Khaleej (assistant)
- 2008–2009: Al-Khaleej
- 2010–2012: Al-Ettifaq (assistant)
- 2012: Al-Ettifaq (interim)
- 2013–2014: Al-Khaleej
- 2014–2015: Al-Nahda
- 2016: Al-Orobah
- 2016: Hajer
- 2018–2019: Al-Khaleej
- 2020–2021: Al-Khaleej
- 2021–2022: Al-Nahda
- * Club domestic league appearances and goals

Sameer Sulaiman Hilal (Arabic: سَمِير سُلَيْمَان هِلَال; born 1967) is a Saudi Arabian former professional football midfielder and manager.

== Career ==
Born in Dammam, Hilal began his senior career at Al-Ettifaq in 1987 and spent 15 years at the club, winning 4 major titles with the club. He moved to Al-Khaleej in 2001 where he spent a season before retiring.

After retiring, Hilal was appointed as an assistant coach at Al-Khaleej in 2007. On 17 November 2008, he was appointed as a caretaker manager following the sacking of Samir Sellimi. He was then appointed as manager until the end of the 2008–09 season. Hilal then returned to Al-Ettifaq as an assistant manager, a position he held for two seasons. Following the sacking of Branko Ivanković, Hilal was named as caretaker manager for the second leg of King Cup tie against Al-Fateh. On 28 May 2013, Hilal was appointed as the manager of Al-Khaleej and led the club to promotion to the Pro League, after finishing as runner-up in the First Division. The following season, Hilal was appointed as the manager of Al-Nahda. He was sacked the following season after picking up just 2 points in the opening four matches. On 9 March 2016, Hilal was appointed as the manager of Al-Orobah until the end of the season. On 7 August 2016, Hilal was appointed as the manager of Hajer, but he was sacked after four months. On 29 May 2018, Hilal was appointed as Al-Khaleej's manager for the third time. They narrowly missed out on promotion after losing the play-offs to Al-Hazem on penalties. On 23 September 2020, Hilal returned to Al-Khaleej for the fourth time as a manager. On 22 July 2021, Hilal was appointed as Al-Nahda's manager.

== Managerial statistics ==
Managerial record by team and tenure
| Team | From | To | Record | | | | |
| Team | From | To | P | W | D | L | Win % |
|---|---|---|---|---|---|---|---|
| Al-Khaleej | 17 November 2008 | 31 May 2009 | 22 | 8 | 8 | 6 | 36.36 |
| Al-Ettifaq | 30 April 2012 | 1 May 2012 | 1 | 0 | 0 | 1 | 0.00 |
| Al-Khaleej | 28 May 2013 | 6 April 2014 | 34 | 16 | 9 | 9 | 47.06 |
| Al-Nahda | 25 May 2014 | 21 September 2015 | 39 | 19 | 11 | 9 | 48.72 |
| Al-Orobah | 9 March 2016 | 30 April 2016 | 7 | 4 | 1 | 2 | 57.14 |
| Hajer | 7 August 2016 | 4 December 2016 | 15 | 7 | 4 | 4 | 46.67 |
| Al-Khaleej | 29 May 2018 | 1 June 2019 | 42 | 17 | 15 | 10 | 40.48 |
| Al-Khaleej | 23 September 2020 | 1 June 2021 | 38 | 13 | 13 | 12 | 34.21 |
| Al-Nahda | 22 July 2021 | 24 March 2022 | 29 | 7 | 10 | 12 | 24.14 |
| Total | | | 227 | 91 | 71 | 65 | 40.09 |

== Honours ==
=== Player ===
Al-Ettifaq

- Saudi Premier League: 1986–87
- Saudi Federation Cup: 1990–91
- Arab Club Champions Cup: 1988
- Gulf Club Champions Cup: 1988

=== Manager ===
Al-Khaleej

- Saudi First Division runner-up: 2013–14 (Promotion to Pro League)
