= Sameer Gulamnabi Kazi =

Indian politician

Chairman, Maharashtra State Board Of Waqf (Minister of State Status)
- Incumbent
- Assumed office 8 August 2024

Member of Maharashtra State Board Of Waqf
- Incumbent
- Assumed office 26 August 2021

Personal details
- Party: Shivsena (Eknath Shinde)
- Occupation: Politician & entrepreneur

Sameer Gulamnabi Kazi is an Indian politician who is duly elected un-opposed as Chairperson of the Maharashtra State Board Of Waqf, to which he was elected by the Maharashtra Government in Waqf Board on 8 August 2024.
