= Samir Feriani =

Tunisian official

Samir Feriani is a Tunisian official (sources variously described him as a police officer or a senior Interior Ministry employee). A whistleblower, he was arrested in May 2011 and came to be known as the "first 'Prisoner of Conscience' in the post revolutionary Tunisia". He was released in September 2011, and acquitted of most charges in March 2012.

== Arrest, trial and release ==
On May 29, 2011 Feriani was arrested in Tunis, for allegedly "harming the external security of the state", "releasing and distributing information likely to harm public order", and "accusing, without proof, a public agent of violating law". Before his arrest Feriani sent two letters to Tunisia's internal minister, Habib Essid, in which he named several senior officials, who he alleged had committed human rights abuses during the Tunisian revolution, and had since then been destroying the evidence. His accusations were reported in two independent Tunisian newspapers, El Khabir and l'Audace, days before his arrest.

In response to his arrest, Tunisian activists organized a series of protests, many of them online (using Facebook and Twitter). Feriani's arrest was condemned by the Human Rights Watch.

On September 22, Feriani was released by a military court. In March 2012 he was acquitted of major charges, but fined for "accusing a public employee of violating law without proof". Feriani was satisfied with the outcome, expressing his hopes that it will mark the start of a deeper investigation into the Ministry of Interior's corruption, and that he will be reappointed to his position with the Ministry.
