= Sameer Rao =

Indian Bansuri flautist (born 1982)

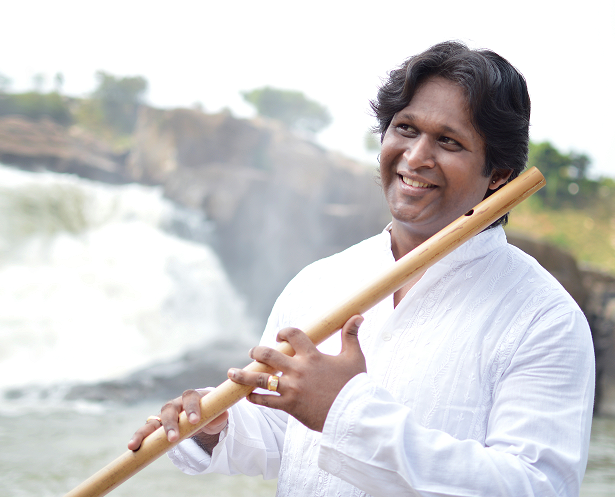
- Sameer Rao
- Born: 12 May 1982 (age 44); Mysore, Karnataka, India
- Occupations: Flutist, composer
- Website: www.bansurisameer.com

Sameer Rao (born 12 May 1982) is an Indian flautist who plays the bansuri, the Indian bamboo flute. He is one of the prominent disciples of Pandit Hariprasad Chaurasia.

== Early life ==
Sameer Rao was born in Shimoga, Karnataka, moving to Mysore at a young age. He began playing the flute (bansuri) at age 11; he began his formal training in North Indian classical music under Pandit Veerabhadriah Hiremath. He was chosen as a disciple by the flautist Pandit Hariprasad Chaurasia in 2002.

Sameer was a resident student of Vrindaban Gurukul, Mumbai that keeps alive to this day the ancient Guru-Shishya Parampara of the traditional Gurukul, trained under Pandit Hariprasad Chaurasia from the year 2004 to 2010.

== Career ==
From 2010 to 2012, Sameer worked at the newly constructed Gurukul by his Guruji in Bhubaneswar, Orissa. There, Sameer mentored the music students and also managed the operational activities of Gurukul.

Sameer has played at both individual concerts and jugalbandis. Sameer has also accompanied his Guruji, Pandit Hariprasad Chaurasia, on many of his concerts. He has released albums internationally.

== Awards and recognition ==
The Music and Dance Academy of Karnataka has awarded Sameer with a scholarship during the year 1997–1998. Sameer was conferred with the "Yuva Pratibha" award by The Directorate of Kannada and Culture, government of Karnataka, in 2004. Recognizing his mastery in Bansuri, Sri Guru Ganayogi Panchakshara Sangeet Yogashram Trust, Chennai chose him for the "Award of Excellence" in 2004. Other awards include "NadaKIshore" by Nada Bramha Sangeeetha Sabha of Mysore in 2006 and "Surmani" by the Sur Singar Samsad of Mumbai in 2008.

== Discography ==
- In the Moonlight – 2015
- Kaushi Kanada – 2015
- Shades of Bamboo – 2016
- Breathing Through Bansuri – 2016
- Mansoon Majesty – 2017
- Cosmic Conversations – 2017
- Following his footsteps – 2018
- Dhyaana – 2019
- Panchabhoota – 2019
- Haripriaya − 2020

== Personal life ==
Sameer lives in Mysore.
