= Samir Jundi =

Palestinian writer and publisher

- Born: 1958 (age 67–68); Palestine, Jerusalem
- Occupations: Palestinian writer and publisher

Samir Jundi (born November 29, 1958, in Jerusalem) is a Palestinian writer and publisher who founded Dar Al-Jundi for publishing and has several literary and critical writings.

== His upbringing and education ==
He was born in 1985 in East Jerusalem to blind parents, refugees from the village of Deir Yassin, where he received his school education at the Al-Aytam (orphans) Islamic School. He received a diploma in education and a BA in Arabic literature from Al-Quds University, and a MA in Arabic language in modern criticism, and he works today as a lecturer at Al-Quds University.

== Cultural work ==
Founded Dar Al-Jundi for Publishing and Distribution. The house defines itself as having been established to support Palestinian writers. It seeks to contribute in preserving Jerusalem's cultural identity and help young writers publish their works.

== Syndicalist work ==
He participated at founding the General Union of Palestinian Teachers in the Occupied Territories, he is the head of the Syndicate of Workers in the Private Education Sector in Jerusalem, and a member of the General Union of Palestinian Writers. Al-Jundi is one of the members of the Seventh Day symposium - the Palestinian National Theatre, and he contributes with writings to the local and international newspapers and magazines. He also writes blogs on the web pages and he has literary criticism studies and working papers published on the web pages. Samir Al-Jundi held several positions in syndicalist work, and he also represented Palestine in international and world conferences.

== Literary and critical books ==
- “Al tofan” (The Flood), short stories, Al Dar for Publishing and Distribution, Jerusalem, 2006.
- ”Nabbat” (beats), short stories, The General Union of Palestinian Writers and Writers, Jerusalem, 2008.
- “Al Kholod” (Immortality), a novel, Al-Jundi House for Publishing and Distribution, Jerusalem, 2009.
- Bab Al-Amoud, a collection of short stories, Dar Al-Jundi for Publishing and Distribution, Jerusalem, 2011. The novel was translated into English by Mohamed Achraf El Bouhssini.
- The Palestinian Novel and Heritage, Dima Al-Samman's Novels as a Model, Dar Al-Jundi for Publishing and Distribution, Jerusalem, 2011.
- “dorj al taabuna” (The bekery drawer), 2012.
- “al manhaj al'uslubii bayn al nazaria w al tatbiq“ (The stylistic approach between theory and practice) 2013.
- Fantasia, Dar Al-Jundi for Publishing and Distribution, Jerusalem, 2016, 2016.
- “hawae fi dubai” (Eve in Dubai), Dar Al-Jundi for Publishing and Distribution, Jerusalem, 2014.

== Awards ==
- Al-Quds Zahrat Al-Madaen Prize, 2008 from the Palestinian Intellectuals Union, 2008 - for the best literary texts - for his book “Nabadat” (beats)
- Best Publishing House Award at the Sharjah Book Fair, 2015
