= Society of Hospital Medicine =

- Company type: Non-profit organization
- Industry: Hospital Medicine, Hospitalists, Internal Medicine
- Founded: 1997
- Headquarters: Philadelphia, Pennsylvania, United States
- Key people: Eric E. Howell, MD, MHM; (CEO); Jerome C. Siy, MD, MHA, SFHM; (Current President); Danielle Scheurer, MD, MSCR, SFHM; (Immediate Past-President)
- Services: Education; Practice Management; Careers; Advocacy; Community
- Website: www.hospitalmedicine.org

The Society of Hospital Medicine (SHM) is a membership society for hospitalists, physicians, and other caregivers who practice the specialty of hospital medicine.

SHM provides continuing education and industry updates for hospitalists in its monthly newsmagazine, The Hospitalist, and peer-reviewed journal for hospital medicine, the Journal of Hospital Medicine. In addition to its publications, the society conducts surveys, prepares written analyses, and offers discussion forums that aid in the overall development and practice of the specialty of hospital medicine.

The society is focused on providing resources, programs, and mentoring for quality improvement programs for reducing readmissions and hospital acquired diseases while optimizing transitions of care, glycemic control, and overall patient care. SHM has been integral in the development of policy and position statements to address the concerns and issues of hospitalists and advocates on behalf of hospitalists before government and regulatory agencies.

== History ==
Founded in 1997 by Internists John Nelson, MD, MHM, of Bellevue, Washington and Winthrop Whitcomb, MD, MHM, of Springfield, Massachusetts, the Society of Hospital Medicine was originally known as the National Association of Inpatient Physicians. The society's goals include promoting high-quality care for hospitalized patients; advancing education and research in hospital medicine; enhancing medical teamwork to achieve the best care for hospitalized patients; supporting career paths to attract and retain high quality hospitalists; defining competencies, activities and needs of hospitalists; and advocating, proposing, and promoting changes to the healthcare system that lead to better care by hospitalists.

A history of the Society of Hospital Medicine, and in many ways the hospital medicine movement:

- 1996: In a New England Journal of Medicine article, Drs. Robert M. Wachter and Lee Goldman coin the term “hospitalist”. An article in Internal Medicine News profiling John Nelson's work as a hospitalist catches the eye of Winthrop Whitcomb, who contacts Nelson and suggests they form an organization.
- 1997 (January): A national database of hospitalists and hospital medicine programs is developed and put to use by the National Association of Inpatient Physicians (NAIP) with its first newsletter mailing
- 1997 (April): The initial national meeting of hospitalists is held as the National Association of Inpatient Physicians holds its first meeting (“Management of the Hospitalized Patient” Conference), hosted by the University of California, San Francisco
- 1998 (April): The National Association of Inpatient Physicians holds its first annual meeting not affiliated with another event
- 1999 (Spring): The National Association of Inpatient Physicians issues a position statement that referrals to hospitalists from primary physicians should be voluntary
- 2003 (Spring): The National Association of Inpatient Physicians changes its name to the Society of Hospital Medicine
- 2008 (September): The Society of Hospital Medicine selects and implements first six Project BOOST pilot sites
- 2010 (April): The Society of Hospital Medicine published The Core Competencies in Pediatric Hospital Medicine with endorsement from the Academic Pediatric Association and the American Academy of Pediatrics
- 2011: The Society of Hospital Medicine is awarded the John M. Eisenberg Award for Innovation in Patient Safety and Quality by The Joint Commission and the National Quality Forum, citing its Hartford Foundation-funded Project BOOST
- 2016: The Society of Hospital Medicine is awarded the John M. Eisenberg Award for Innovation in Patient Safety and Quality by The Joint Commission and the National Quality Forum as part of the I-PASS Study Group
- 2019 (March): The Society of Hospital Medicine initiates the first National Hospitalist Day, held annually the first Thursday in March

== Publications and Resources ==
=== The Hospitalist ===
The Hospitalist news magazine reports on issues and trends in hospital medicine. It reaches more than 35,000 hospitalists, physician assistants, nurse practitioners, residents, and medical administrators interested in the practice and business of hospital medicine.

=== Journal of Hospital Medicine ===
The Journal of Hospital Medicine is the peer-reviewed journal in the field of hospital medicine. The journal focuses on pressing medical issues and healthcare trends that affect hospital medicine and patient care while providing extensive research articles and evidence-based reviews.

Mission Statement

- The Journal of Hospital Medicine advances excellence in hospital medicine as a defined specialty through the dissemination of research, evidence-based clinical care, and advocacy of safe, effective care for hospitalized patients.

Goals

- Promote research and education in hospital medicine through publication of original, peer-reviewed research articles and systematic reviews on topics relevant to hospital medicine.
- Promote high quality care for all hospitalized patients with an emphasis on patient safety.
- Promote teamwork and communication among all health care providers in hospitals to achieve optimal care for hospitalized patients.
- Define the competencies, activities, and needs of hospitalists.
- Support, propose, and promote changes to the health care system that lead to higher quality and more efficient care for all hospitalized patients.
- Foster debate on issues relevant to care of the hospitalized patient and engage health policy makers in promoting evidence-based best practices in hospital care.
- Anticipate important issues and trends in hospital care.
- Provide career path information intended to attract and retain the highest quality hospitalists.
- Produce a publication that is trustworthy, judicious, and intellectually stimulating.
- Uphold the highest standards of editorial integrity and ethical medical journalism.
- Provide continuing medical education in hospital medicine.

== Continuing Education ==
The specialty of hospital medicine is made up of a varied constituency with both overlapping and discrete educational needs. These constituencies include academic hospitalists, clinicians-internists, family physicians, pediatricians, hospital medicine group leaders, researchers, clinical educators, nurse practitioners, physician assistants, hospital administrators, and pharmacists.

The society focuses on lifelong learning for these constituencies. Its main focus is the enhancement of hospitalists’ knowledge on topics related to specific clinical situations and the fostering of independent learning through traditional and emerging channels.

Members of the society can also be earn or be nominated to become a fellow or senior fellow in Hospital Medicine.

== Fellow in Hospital Medicine Designation ==
The Society of Hospital Medicine's Fellows Program is rooted in the Society's Core Competencies in Hospital Medicine. Those who earn the Fellow in Hospital Medicine, Senior Fellow in Hospital Medicine, or Master in Hospital Medicine designations have demonstrated their commitment to hospital medicine, system change and quality improvement principles.

- To become a Fellow in Hospital Medicine (FHM), the candidate must demonstrate a commitment to hospital medicine and must follow certain requirements in order to receive Hospital Medicine Designation.
- To become a Senior Fellow in Hospital Medicine (SFHM), the candidate must follow a similar process to that of becoming a fellow, but with additional criteria within leadership, teamwork, and quality improvement that enable candidates to demonstrate a higher level of performance and commitment to hospital medicine.
- Masters in Hospital Medicine (MHM) are distinguished by the excellence and significance of his or her contributions to the field of hospital medicine and healthcare as a whole. They have been selected because of personal character, positions of honor, contributions towards furthering the goals of the Society of Hospital Medicine, distinction in practice education, medical research, and other achievements in science or in the art of hospital medicine.

== Continuing Medical Education and Maintenance of Certification ==
Hospital medicine is the first area to be awarded focused practice recognition by the American Board of Internal Medicine.

=== Project BOOST ===
Project BOOST (Better Outcomes by Optimizing Safe Transitions) is an initiative wherein hospitals receive expert monitoring and peer support to aid in improving the care of patients as the transition from hospital to home. BOOST members help hospital teams to map current processes and create and implement actions plans for organizational change. BOOST provides a suite of evidence-based clinical interventions that can be easily adapted and integrated into each unique hospital environment. By improving the hospital discharge care transition. Project BOOST aims to:

- Identify patients at high risk of re-hospitalization and target specific interventions to mitigate potential adverse events
- Reduce 20-day readmission rates
- Improve patient satisfaction scores and H-CAHPS scores related to discharge
- Improve flow of information between hospital and outpatient providers
- Improve communication between providers and patients
- Optimize discharge process

Project BOOST centers around 5 key elements, and there are currently over 180 mentor sites, located in 31 United States and one in Canada, which participate in Project BOOST. In 2011, the Society of Hospital Medicine was awarded the John M. Eisenberg Award for Innovation in Patient Safety and Quality by The Joint Commission and the National Quality Forum for its work on Project BOOST.

== Advocacy and Public Policy ==
In recent years,, the Society of Hospital Medicine and its members have changed the healthcare landscape by:

- Connecting hospitalists with members of Congress and their staffs
- Working to ensure that hospitalists have sensible pathways for participation in Medicare pay for performance programs
- Championing improved access to skilled nursing facility coverage for Medicare beneficiaries

== Relationship with Sanofi-Aventis ==
In May 2011, staff of the Senate Finance Committee issued a report concerning Sanofi-Aventis efforts to secure favorable comments from medical societies to the Food and Drug Administration. These comments raised safety concerns about generic equivalents to the Sanofi-Aventis product Lovenox.

The report, initiated as a result of an article by Alicia Mundy in The Wall Street Journal, and a physician (Victor Tapson, MD) as having submitted comments as part of the Citizen Petition Process without disclosing in the letter their financial ties to the pharmaceutical company. In the case of the Society of Hospital Medicine, those ties amounted to over $2.0M (since 2007) for a variety of uses that included exhibit space, sponsorship and other outreach.
