= Samir Taha =

Samir Taha سمير طه

Palestinian Ambassador to Sudan
- Incumbent
- Assumed office 20 March 2013

Personal details
- Born: Samir Abdul Jabbar Ismail Taha; 15 July 1961 (age 64) Jenin, Jordanian annexation of the West Bank

Samir Abdul Jabbar Ismail Taha, also known as Samir Taha, (Arabic: سمير عبد الجبار إسماعيل طه; Born on 15 July 1961 in the city of Jenin – ) was a Palestinian physician, diplomat and member of the nationalist party Fatah.

He was appointed ambassador of the State of Palestine to Sudan. On 20 March 2013, he presented his official credentials to the Sudanese President Omar al-Bashir.

== See also ==
- Palestine-Sudan relations
- Embassy of the State of Palestine in Sudan
