= Samir S. Shah =

American physician

Academic background
- Education: BA, 1993, University of Pennsylvania; MD, 1998, Yale University School of Medicine

Academic work
- Institutions: University of Cincinnati Academic Health Center; Cincinnati Children's Hospital Medical Center; Perelman School of Medicine at the University of Pennsylvania; Children's Hospital of Philadelphia

Samir S. Shah is an American pediatric hospital medicine and pediatric infectious disease physician. Shah's research has focused on improved management of patients with common childhood infections, particularly pneumonia and meningitis.

== Early life and education ==
Shah earned his Bachelor of Arts degree from the University of Pennsylvania in 1993 before enrolling at Yale University School of Medicine. One of the requirements to graduate Yale required Shah to complete a research project, which resulted in him staying an extra year to pursue teaching and research interests. Upon graduating from Yale in 1998, he received the Vernon W. Lippard Prize and completed his residency and fellowship in both Pediatric Infectious Diseases and Academic General Pediatrics at the Children's Hospital of Philadelphia.

== Career ==
Upon completing his medical residency and fellowships, Shah became an assistant professor of pediatrics and epidemiology at the Perelman School of Medicine at the University of Pennsylvania and an attending physician at Children's Hospital of Philadelphia. During his early years at the school, he joined the Journal of Hospital Medicines editorial leadership team in 2009 and was later appointed as deputy editor in 2012 and senior deputy editor in 2015.

Shah has helped to develop and better leverage data infrastructure to help scale research and link variation in clinical practice to outcomes nationally to determine best clinical practice. His research was supported by the National Institutes of Allergy and Infectious Diseases from 2008-2013. This work focused on developing models to predict pneumonia severity of illness in children. He also received research support from the Robert Wood Johnson Foundation Physician Faculty Scholar Program from 2008 until 2011 where he worked on his project "Predicting Adverse Outcomes in Children with Community-Acquired Pneumonia." In recognition of his efforts, Shah was the recipient of the Pediatric Infectious Disease Society Young Investigator Award and the Society of Hospital Medicine Excellence in Research Award. In 2014, Shah led the Improving Adherence to Evidence-Based Recommendations for Common Serious Childhood Infections research team at Cincinnati Children's Hospital Medical Center which earned the 2014 SHM's Award of Excellence in Teamwork in Quality Improvement.

In January 2019, Shah was appointed Editor-in-Chief of the Journal of Hospital Medicine, having previously served as the Clinical Review and Education Editor for JAMA Pediatrics and as a founding associate editor of the Journal of the Pediatric Infectious Diseases Society. He was later named a Masters in Hospital Medicine "in honor of his leadership in hospital medicine as a stellar researcher, devoted mentor, and key contributor to the Society." The MHM is the Society of Hospital Medicine's highest honor and is reserved for hospitalists who have uniquely distinguished themselves in the speciality through the excellence and significance of their contributions to hospital medicine specifically and health care as a whole. While serving as Editor-in-Chief, Shah oversaw the Clinical Guideline Highlights for the Hospitalist and earned the Academic Pediatric Association's Research Award.

== Honors and awards ==
2015 Miller-Sarkin Award from American Pediatric Association for outstanding mentorship to learners and colleagues

2020 Research Award from American Pediatric Association for advancing pediatric knowledge through excellence in research
