= Journal of Hospital Medicine =

- Discipline: Hospital medicine
- Language: English
- Edited by: Samir S. Shah

Publication details
- History: 2006-present
- Publisher: Society of Hospital Medicine
- Frequency: Monthly
- Impact factor: 2.19 (2018)

Standard abbreviations
- ISO 4: J. Hosp. Med.

Indexing
- ISSN: 1553-5592 (print); 1553-5606 (web)
- LCCN: 2004216088
- OCLC no.: 56988860

Links
- Journal homepage; Online archive

The Journal of Hospital Medicine is a monthly peer-reviewed medical journal covering hospital medicine. It was established in 2006 and is published by the Society of Hospital Medicine, of which it is the official journal. The editor-in-chief is Samir S. Shah (Cincinnati Children's Hospital Medical Center). According to the Journal Citation Reports, the journal has a 2015 impact factor of 2.143.
