= Samir Loutfi El-Sayed =

Egyptian volleyball player (born 1945)

Personal information
- Nationality: Egyptian
- Born: 1 July 1945 (age 79)

Sport
- Sport: Volleyball

Samir Loutfi El-Sayed (born 1 July 1945) is an Egyptian volleyball player. He competed in the men's tournament at the 1976 Summer Olympics.
