= Samir Kouro =

Chilean engineer (born 1978)

Samir Kouro is a Chilean professor of electronic engineering who works at Federico Santa María Technical University and have 27 peer-reviewed articles along with 21 journal publications and 3 book chapters which give him an h-index from 14 to 24.

== Biography ==
Samir was born as Samir Felipe Kouro Renaer on March 14, 1978, in Valdivia, Chile. In November 2002, he became an intern at the Federico Santa María Technical University in Valparaíso and two years later, in March, received a master's degree in electronic engineering there. He became a principal investigator during the FONDECYT project and in March 2008 he received a Ph.D. in the same field and became an associate researcher at the same place. From October 2005 to October 2008, he worked as a young researcher at the Scientific Millennium Nucleus on Industrial Electronics and Mechatronics project. From 2009 to 2011, he worked as a postdoc at the Ryerson University in Toronto, Canada. After he completed his studies there he returned to UTFSM where he continues to lecture. In 2012, he worked as a principal investigator again, this time at his alma mater.
