= Samir Sabih =

Iraqi poet

- Born: 1 January 1970; Sadr, Iraq
- Died: 22 October 2021 (51 years); Badra District, Iraq
- Occupation: Poet Television presenter Writer
- Awards: Best Poet at Rabat Festival

Samir Sabih Dahi Al-Quraishi, known as Samir Sabih (Arabic: سمیر صبیح), was an Iraqi poet who began his poetic career in 1988 and belonged to the Generation of Poets of the Eighties. He wrote many Iraqi songs, in addition to presenting poetry programs on Al Iraqiya.

== Works ==
TV

- Rhymes
- The stories
- Poets on the road
- Air is our third

Lyric poems

- I remind you of whoever comes at night, Hatem Al-Iraqi
- Be careful my country, Hussam Al-Rassam
- My son Alawi has grown up, Hussain Al-Jassmi

== Death ==
Samir Sobih died in a traffic collision in Badra District on 22 October 2021. Iraqi President Barham Salih and Iraqi Prime Minister Mustafa Al-Kadhimi offered their condolences on his death.
