= Sameer Kulavoor =

Indian contemporary artist

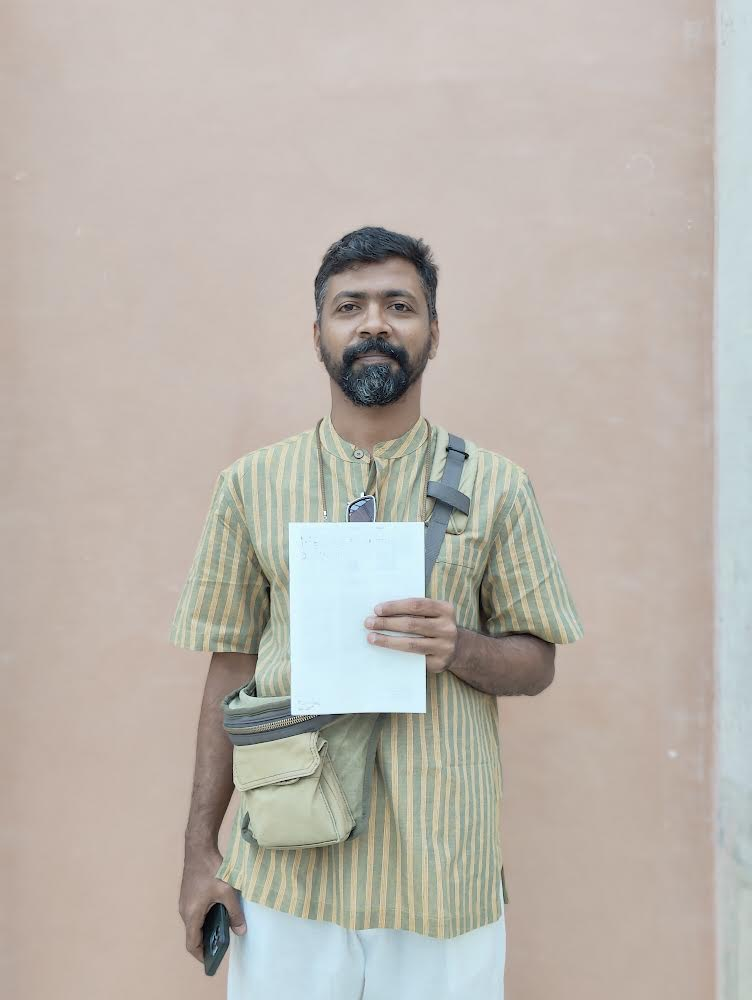
- Born: Mumbai, India
- Education: Sydenham College of Commerce and Economics; Sir J.J. Institute of Applied Art
- Known for: Contemporary art
- Notable work: Ghoda-Cycle Project, Blued Book, Please Have a Seat, A Man of the Crowd, You are All Caught Up
- Relatives: Zeenat Kulavoor (sister)
- Website: https://www.sameerkulavoor.com

Sameer Kulavoor (born 1983) is an Indian contemporary artist and founder of one of the earliest specialised design studios in India, Bombay Duck Designs.

His works include art, graphic design and contemporary illustration. They have taken the form of paintings, murals, books, zines, prints and objects.

Kulavoor was profiled in the third season of the Netflix docu-series, Creative Indians, featuring alongside A R Rahman, Anurag Kashyap, Anita Dongre and Piyush Pandey, amongst others. He was included as one of '50 Most Influential Young Indians' twice by GQ India in 2015 and 2016. Elle Decor named him as part of their 15 Young Artists to follow in 2016.

== Early life and education ==
Kulavoor was born and brought up in the suburbs of Mumbai. He finished junior college from Sydenham College and graduated with a Bachelors in Fine Art (Applied Art) from Sir J J Institute of Applied Arts in 2005.

== Work ==
=== Early years ===
Kulavoor began his design career while still a student, working on freelance design and illustration projects between the years 2001 to 2005. During this time, he made a music video for the song 'Disconnected' for Vishal Dadlani's independent band Pentagram. He made another music video for their song 'Love Drug Climb Down' later in 2010. Between 2005 and 2007, he worked on numerous motion graphics and illustration projects as a freelancer, including for the Indian music channels MTV India and Channel V.

=== Design and self-publishing ===
In 2008, Kulavoor founded the design studio Bombay Duck Designs in Mazgaon, Mumbai. Around this time Kulavoor self-published zines and art books, like the Ghoda-Cycle Project, the Blued Book, Zeroxwala Zine, 100% Zine, Kalaghoda Musings and a series of flip-books. The Blued Book is an illustrated documentation of the use of 'Taad-Patri' or blue tarpaulin used widely and innovatively in different parts of India.

Between 2011 and 2017, Bombay Duck Designs developed and designed the illustrative visual language for the Indian music festival, NH7 Weekender by OML.

In 2012, Kulavoor collaborated with the UK design house Paul Smith for a line of t-shirts with artworks based on the Indian bicycle culture.

=== Art practice ===
An exhibition of his series of art prints 'Please Have a Seat' was held at the Artisans' Center, Kala Ghoda, Mumbai in 2016. Since late 2017, Kulavoor has been represented by the Mumbai-based art gallery Tarq in India.

His first solo show of paintings and sculptures called 'A Man of the Crowd' was held in Mumbai at the Tarq Gallery in 2018. In 2019, a suite of his drawings was exhibited alongside works by writer and journalist Rachel Lopez, photographer, journalist Ritesh Uttamchandani, artist Sudhir Patwardhan, photographers Pallon Daruwala and Peter Bialobrzesk as part of the show 'The Shifting City', an exhibition curated by Kaiwan Mehta, in collaboration with the Architecture Foundation India, and Rahul Mehrotra as project advisor.

'This is Not A Still Life', a series of eight works was exhibited at the India Art Fair, 2020 and a printed version of the same works were used for the facade design of the fair.

In December 2020, Kulavoor's second solo 'You Are All Caught Up' was exhibited at the Tarq Gallery in Mumbai. The show consisted of works made between 2018 and 2020 and included drawings and paintings and explored "personal and political ideas through the lens of social media". Covering the show, the website It's Nice That wrote that "[Kulavoor's] most recent body of work continues this study into the metropolis and analyses the “personal, political and the pandemic”, all the while characteristically placing the city as the backdrop. Very much a reflection of the current global situation, The Migrants Have Left, for example, turns his previously people-focused drawings on its head as it illustrates a life in lockdown".

Kulavoor created a limited edition zine 'Smart City' which was published by the Zurich based independent publishing house Nieves in 2022 and self-published another limited edition zine 'City as Collage' in 2025 as part of the exhibition 'Artist as..' at the Tarq Gallery.

Kulavoor's third solo 'Edifice Complex' was exhibited at Tarq Gallery in 2023 borrowing its title "from a phrase coined by Behn Cervantes, a Filipino activist writing in the time of the autocrat Ferdinand Marcos. It references the phenomenon where individuals, organisations, or governments become obsessed with building grandiose structures to give an impression of power, status or progress, often at the expense of more pressing needs". Some of his recent bodies of work were on display at the Tarq booths at Art Basel, Hong Kong - cited as one of the emerging artists to look out for at the fair by Tatler Asia - and Art Mumbai, both in 2024.

In November 2025, Kulavoor opened his first museum solo titled 'Limits of the Town' at the Dr Bhau Daji Lad Museum in Mumbai curated by Tasneem Zakaria Mehta.

=== Public art ===
Kulavoor played an active role in the revived public art movement in India during the 2010s. In 2017, he painted a mural in the popular art neighbourhood of Kala Ghoda in South Mumbai on display on the exterior walls of Artisans' Center. At the St+Art India exhibition 'Sasson Dock Art Project', he created Parfum Sassoon, a mural and installation representing an imaginary larger-than-life premium perfume brand at the Sassoon Dock area of South Mumbai. His 2019 mural ' Social Media Friendly Plants' for St+Art India, is currently visible at the Lodhi Colony, art district in New Delhi. He also painted the 2020 CEAT House (RPG Building) mural at Worli, in honor of the COVID-19 warriors and frontline workers and the 2021 mural Lokame Tharavadu exhibition for the Kochi-Muziris Biennale at the Alleppey beach in Kerala. A mural of his architecture based drawings is up on the exterior of the Goethe-Institut / Max Mueller Bhavan at Kala Ghoda, Mumbai. His latest public art installation titled 'Metromorphosis', was made in collaboration with artist and production designer Sandeep Meher, as part of St+Art India's 'Mumbai Urban Art Project' consisting of multiple sculptures, each a unique composition of miniature, stacked urban architectural structures in Mumbai.

=== Academic ===
Kulavoor together with architect Rahul Malandkar conducted a studio course titled 'What's Architecture Got to Do With It?' at CEPT University, Ahmedabad in the spring semester of 2024. In 2023, Kulavoor gave a talk at Central Saint Martins, University of Arts, London as part of their 'Practice is Critical' series and a lecture for the students of the Architecture Faculty, Hong Kong University in 2024.
