= Samir Moussaab =

Samir Moussaab (born Samir Saioud) was the second highest-ranking member of the "North African Islamic Al-Qaeda" until the Algerian army shot and killed him in Si Moustapha village in Boumerdes, Algeria on April 26, 2007. Former members of the Salafist Group for Call and Combat, which changed its name to Al-Qaeda in Islamic North Africa when it allied with Al-Qaeda in January 2007, identified his body.
