= Samir Lemoudaâ =

Algerian footballer (born 1981)

Personal information
- Full name: Samir Lemoudaâ
- Date of birth: July 20, 1981 (age 45)
- Place of birth: Chelghoum Laïd, Algeria
- Position: Midfielder

Team information
- Current team: CA Bordj Bou Arréridj
- Number: 12

Senior career*
Years	Team	Apps	(Gls)
2005–2006	MO Béjaïa	-	(-)
2006–2007	ES Sétif	13	(0)
2007–2008	USM Sétif	-	(-)
2008–2009	CA Batna	-	(-)
2009–2010	MSP Batna	28	(4)
2010–	CA Bordj Bou Arréridj	17	(0)
- * Club domestic league appearances and goals as of 00:00, July 1, 2011 (UTC)

Samir Lemoudaâ, last name also spelt sometimes Lemouadaâ, (born 20 July 1981) is an Algerian professional footballer who plays as a midfielder for Algerian Ligue Professionnelle 2 club CA Bordj Bou Arreridj.

Lemoudaâ was a member of the ES Sétif team that won the 2006-07 Algerian Championnat National and the 2006–07 Arab Champions League.

== Honours ==
=== Club ===
- ES Sétif
  - Algerian Championnat National: 2006–07
  - Arab Champions League: 2006–07
