= Samir Altaqi =

Syrian researcher and political activist

Personal details
- Born: 1 January 1951 (age 75) Aleppo, Syria
- Spouse: Nahed Yakan
- Children: Basel Altaqi, Wael Altaqi, Anwar Altaqi, Ayman Altaqi
- Parent(s): Anwar Altaqi, Aisha Sraj
- Education: University of Aleppo
- Occupation: General Director of ORC (Orient Research Centre)

Ahmad Samir Altaqi (Arabic: أحمد سمير التقي) (born 1 January 1951) is a Syrian researcher and political activist. Previously a cardio-vascular surgeon, he gradually shifted to politics. As of 2016 he served as General Director of the Orient Research Centre in Dubai. He previously served as Director for International Studies in Damascus until 2010.

== Early life ==
Altaqi is a cardio-vascular surgeon. He graduated in 1975 from the faculty of Medicine, University of Aleppo and pursued advanced studies in cardio-vascular surgery. He worked as head of the Plastic Surgery department at Al-Razi Hospital, Aleppo. He was later appointed head of medical services at the Health Department in the Governorate of Aleppo. In this role, he supervised and audited the operation of all the hospitals in the governorate.

In 2000, while practicing as Head of Medical Staff at Red Crescent Hospital in Damascus, he consulted for the Syrian Minister of Health. In 2004, he consulted for the Syrian Prime Minister on health Issues. He addressed health planning, health insurance and medical services organization.

Introducing himself as a leftist, he served one term in the Syrian Parliament.

The Syrian Foreign Ministry financed the Orient Research Centre for International Studies in Damascus, and Altaqi became its General Director. In 2005 Altaqi served as Director of the Orient Center for International Studies. The center specialized in foreign and strategic studies affiliated to the Syrian foreign ministry. In 2010, the center was closed in part due to political oppression.

He spent the Academic year 2010/2011 as an academic fellow at the University of St Andrews in Scotland.

In 2011, Altaqi established the Orient Research Centre in Dubai. The Center is an independent thinktank working on strategic economic and social domains related to the Middle East.

== Memberships ==
- Fellow at the Center for Syrian Studies at the University of St Andrews, Scotland.
- Member of the Syrian Association for Cardio Vascular Diseases
- Member of the Syrian Medical Association
- Member of the Syrian Parliament between (1994–1998)

== Publications ==
Altaqi blogs as "Samir Taqi". He published many Political researches in both English and Arabic:

- Structure of the Syrian State and Mechanism of Decision making.
- Perspective of the Syrian policies in post-Middle East Peace Process Era.
- Management of political Institutions in crisis.
- What Strategy in Informative Age for Syria.
- Needs and role of political Decision support focus groups.
- Reproduction of Backwardness in the Arab and Muslim World
