= Samir Saba =

Dominican Journalist

- Born: May 16, 1981 (age 45); Santo Domingo, Dominican Republic
- Occupations: Journalist, television producer and presenter
- Years active: 1997–present
- Television: CDN 37, Teleantillas, CERTV, Famosos Inside, Enfoque Final, Más que noticias
- Website: https://samirsaba.com

Samir Saba (born May 16, 1981), is a Dominican journalist and television producer and presenter. He is one of the presenters of the morning show “El Mangú de la Mañana”, broadcast on RTVD (Radio Televisión Dominicana). Until february of 2022, was the producer of the TV program Famosos Inside and presenter of the entertainment segments of the TV news programs Más que noticias and Enfoque Final, broadcast on CDN 37.

== Early life ==
Saba was born May 16, 1981, in Santo Domingo, Dominican Republic, into a family of Lebanese descent. He studied primary and secondary school in the Santa Clara school of Santo Domingo and studied communication at the Santo Domingo Catholic University.

== Career ==
He started his professional career as a television presenter in 1997 in the TV program El país que queremos aired on CERTV channel 4, sponsored by UNICEF, for social change and action in the Dominican Republic. In 1998 he started working for the magazines Listin 2000, Evasión and Listeen , part of the Dominican newspaper Listín Diario. In 2000 Saba started working as a host in the radio show Milenium Site broadcast on Milenium 103.3FM.

Saba started working as a columnist for the renowned El Caribe newspaper in 2001 for the entertainment section and in 2005 returned to the TV as a reporter for the TV program De calle con Dafne broadcast on Teleantillas channel 2 and later continued as the presenter for the TV program Esquina 37 aired on CDN 37, which was the start of a career as a TV producer and presenter with the commercial broadcasting company.

He had his own radio show, “Otra nota con Samir Saba” in La Nota Diferente radio station.

Was the director of “Messenger Mag” magazine and the chief editor of “Acrópolis Magazine”.

He was the secretary of public relations for the Dominican Association of Art Critics (ACROARTE) from 2012 to 2014 and Secretary of International Relations from 2017 to 2019 and has remained an active member in the organization. Also was the Secretary of Finances from 2021 to 2023.

Samir Saba has been nominated for the ''Micrófono de Oro'' award by the Radio Hosts Association of the Dominican Republic and nominated for the National Youth Award in the Youth Journalism category by the Dominican government.

In 2019, the entertainment TV program Famosos Inside was awarded ''Best Entertainment TV program in the Caribbean'' in the 305 Latin Awards in Miami.

And Saba won the “Primero de agosto award” in 2020 as “the best presenter of a show business TV program”.

Saba is the Public Relations executive of Consejo Nacional para la Niñez y Adolescencia (Conani).

Collaborates as a journalist for “Showbuzz” magazine.
