= Samir Bajtarević =

Bosnian footballer

Personal information
- Full name: Samir Bajtarević
- Date of birth: 20 April 1969 (age 57)
- Place of birth: Sarajevo, SFR Yugoslavia
- Position: Midfielder

Senior career*
Years	Team	Apps	(Gls)
1995–1998	Rudar Breza	67	(7)
1998–1999	Rudar Ugljevik		

International career^{‡}
1997	Bosnia and Herzegovina	4	(0)
- * Club domestic league appearances and goals ‡ National team caps and goals as of 12 June 2021

Samir Bajtarević (born 20 April 1969) is a Bosnian retired football player. He was elected a delegate of the FA of Zenica-Doboj Canton at the Football Association of Bosnia and Herzegovina in January 2015.

== International career ==
Bajtarević made four appearances for Bosnia and Herzegovina, all at the 1997 Dunhill Cup in Kuala Lumpur. His final international was against China.
