= Samir Saïd Haribou =

French footballer (born 2007)

Personal information
- Date of birth: 18 April 2007 (age 19)
- Place of birth: Ouangani, Mayotte, France
- Position: Striker

Team information
- Current team: Lorient B

Youth career
- 2017–2018: US Ouangani
- 2018–2020: AS Sada
- 2020–2021: La Tamponnaise
- 2021–2022: Saint-Denis
- 2022–: Lorient

Senior career*
Years	Team	Apps	(Gls)
2023–	Lorient B	9	(0)

International career^{‡}
2024–	France U17	2	(0)
- * Club domestic league appearances and goals as of 20 April 2024 ‡ National team caps and goals as of 15 February 2024

Samir Saïd Haribou (born 18 April 2007) is a French footballer who plays as a striker for Lorient B.

== Early life ==
As a youth player, Haribou joined a youth academy in Reunion, France. He was spotted there by French footballer Toifilou Maoulida, who brought him to mainland France.

== Career ==
Haribou started his career with French side Lorient B. He was regarded as one of the clubs most important youth players. On 10 November 2023, he debuted for the club during a 1–2 loss to Stade Briochin.

== Style of play ==
Haribou mainly operates as a striker. He is known for his speed.

== Personal life ==
Haribou was born in 2007. He is a native of Ouangani, Mayotte, France.
