= Samir Sellimi =

Tunisian footballer

Personal information
- Date of birth: 5 June 1970 (age 56)
- Place of birth: Le Kram, Tunisia
- Position: Midfielder

Senior career*
Years	Team	Apps	(Gls)
1987–1997	Club Africain		

International career
1988–1995	Tunisia	49	(0)

Managerial career
- 2007: Najran
- 2008: Al-Khaleej
- 2016–2017: Club Africain (director of sports)
- 2017–2018: US Ben Guerdane
- 2019–2020: AS Marsa
- * Club domestic league appearances and goals

Samir Sellimi (born 5 June 1970) is a Tunisian footballer who played as a midfielder. He made 49 appearances for the Tunisia national team from 1988 to 1995. He was also named in Tunisia's squad for the 1994 African Cup of Nations tournament. After retiring he became a manager.

He is a brother of fellow Tunisian international Adel Sellimi.
