= Samir Machado de Machado =

Brazilian writer

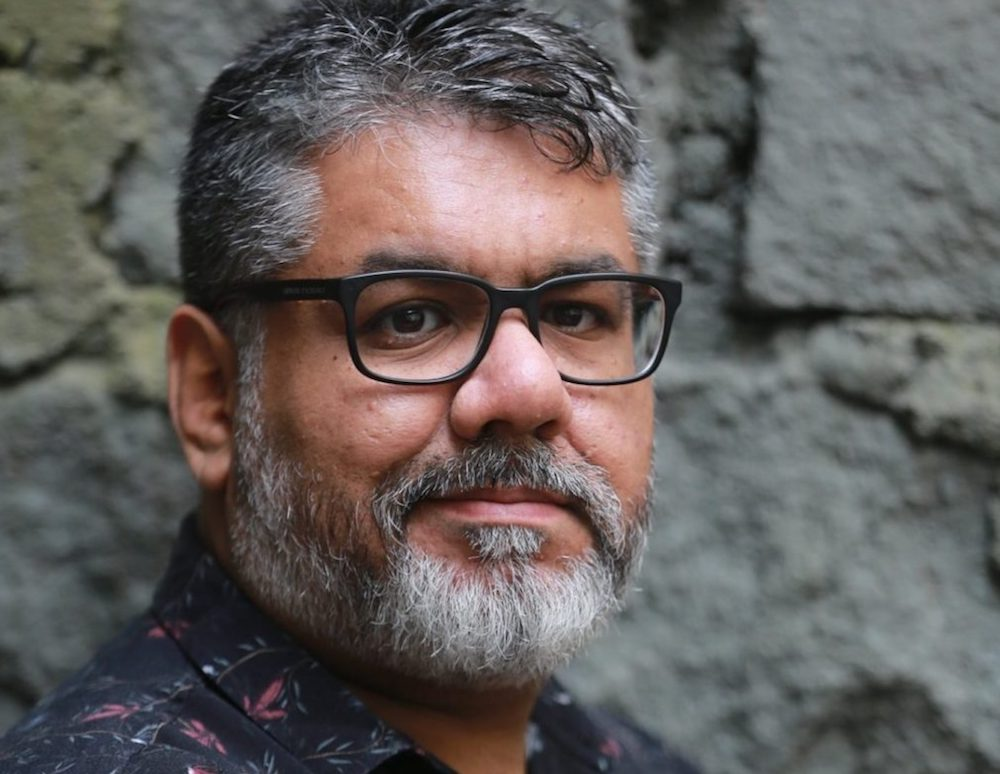
- Born: July 3, 1981 (age 45); Porto Alegre, Rio Grande do Sul, Brazil
- Education: Pontifícia Universidade Católica do Rio Grande do Sul
- Occupation: Writer

Samir Machado de Machado ( born 1981) is a Brazilian writer, editor, translator and graphic designer. Among the recurring themes in his work is the exploration of LGBT perspectives within historical genre narratives, as seen in his novels Homens Elegantes (2016) and O Crime do Bom Nazista [Murder on the Graf Zeppelin] (2023)

== Works ==
=== Books ===
- 2008 - O Professor de Botânica - novel (Não Editora)
- 2013 - Quatro Soldados - novel (Rocco)
- 2016 - Homens Elegantes - novel (Rocco)
- 2018 - Tupinilândia - novel (Todavia)
- 2019 - Piratas à Vista - novel (FTD Educação)
- 2020 - Corpos Secos (with Luisa Geisler, Marcelo Ferroni and Natalia Borges Polesso) - novel (Alfaguara)
- 2021 - Homens Cordiais - novel (Rocco)
- 2023 - O Crime do Bom Nazista - novel (Todavia)
  - English translation: Murder on the Graf Zeppelin (translated by Rahul Bery, Pushkin Press, 2025 -First published as The Good Nazi)

=== Participations in anthologies ===
- 2019 - A Resistência dos Vagalumes - participation with the short story Princesa Serafina
