= Samir Abdellaoui =

Tunisian politician

- Education: University of Tunis
- Children: 1

Samir Abdellaoui is the governor of Bizerte, the northernmost governorate in Tunisia. He was appointed by President Kais Saied following the removal of his predecessor from office, Mohamed Gouider, by the presidential decree number 102/2021, on 12 August 2021.

== Education ==
Samir Abdellaoui has a license in judicial sciences from the University of Tunis.

== Personal life ==
Abdellaoui was born in 1980. He is married and has one son. He is from Awled haffouz, Sidi Bouzid.
