= Nephritic syndrome =

Symptoms resulting from kidney inflammation

- Other names: Acute nephritic syndrome
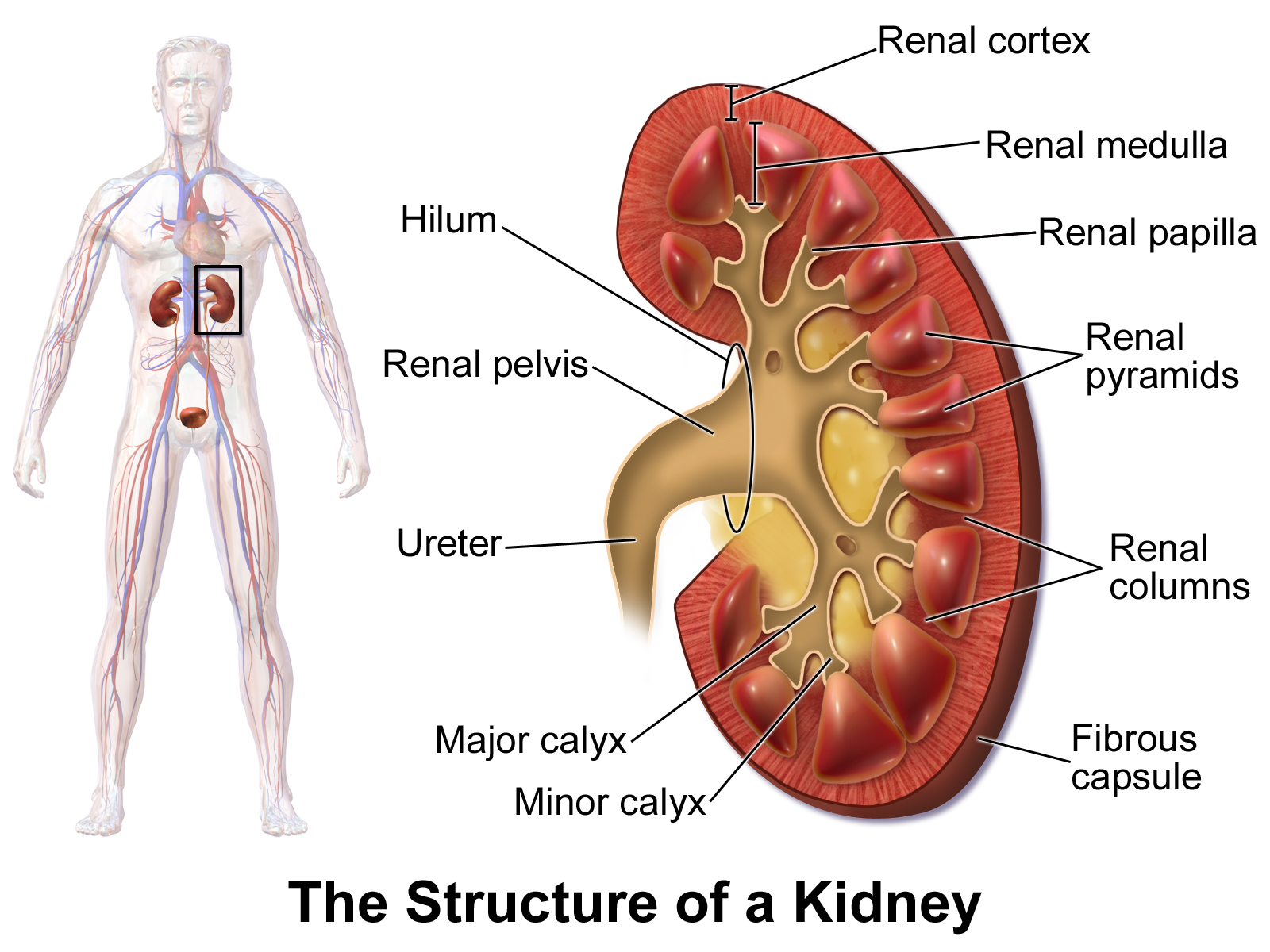
- A graphic representation of the kidney.
- Specialty: Nephrology
- Symptoms: Oliguria
- Causes: Infectious, autoimmune, or thrombotic
- Diagnostic method: Urinalysis, kidney biopsy
- Treatment: Antihypertensives

Nephritic syndrome is a syndrome comprising signs of nephritis, which is kidney disease involving inflammation. It often occurs in the glomerulus, where it is called glomerulonephritis. Glomerulonephritis is characterized by inflammation and thinning of the glomerular basement membrane and the occurrence of small pores in the podocytes of the glomerulus. These pores become large enough to permit both proteins and red blood cells to pass into the urine (yielding proteinuria and hematuria, respectively). By contrast, nephrotic syndrome is characterized by proteinuria and a constellation of other symptoms that specifically do not include hematuria. Nephritic syndrome, like nephrotic syndrome, may involve low level of albumin in the blood due to the protein albumin moving from the blood to the urine.

== Signs and symptoms ==
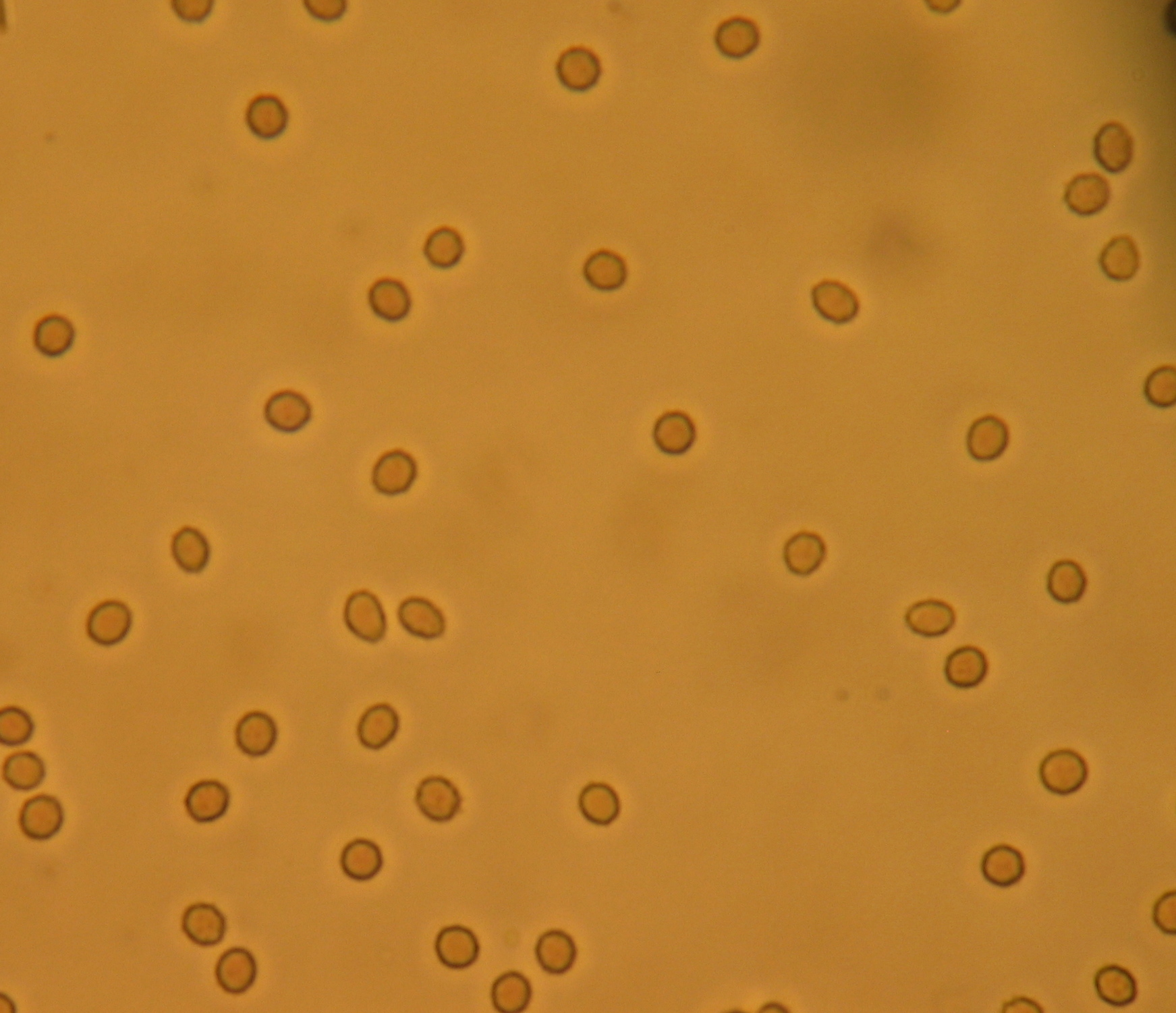
Hematuria (one of the symptoms of Nephritic syndrome

Historically, nephritic syndrome has been characterized by blood in the urine (hematuria), high blood pressure (hypertension), decreased urine output <400 ml/day (oliguria), red blood cell casts, pyuria, and mild to moderate proteinuria. If the condition is allowed to progress without treatment, it can eventually lead to azotemia and uremic symptoms. This constellation of symptoms contrasts with the classical presentation of nephrotic syndrome (excessive proteinuria >3.5 g/day, low plasma albumin levels (hypoalbuminemia) <3 g/L, generalized edema, and hyperlipidemia).Signs and symptoms that are consistent with nephritic syndrome include:

- Hematuria (red blood cells in the urine)
- Proteinuria (protein in the urine) ranging from sub-nephrotic (<3.5 g/day) to >10 g/day, although it is rarely above nephrotic range proteinuria levels.
- Hypertension resting blood pressure is persistently at or above 130/80 or 140/90 mmHg.
- Blurred vision
- Azotemia (increased plasma Urea and Creatinine)
- Oliguria (low urine output <400 ml/day)
- Red blood cell casts (seen with urinalysis and microscopy)
- Pyuria (white blood cells or pus in the urine)

== Causes ==
Purpura

Nephritic syndrome is caused by extensive inflammatory damage to the glomerulus capillaries, which is associated with a variety of medical conditions that are discussed below. Furthermore, the cause of this inflammation can be infectious, autoimmune, or thrombotic. The causative conditions can be divided conveniently between age groups as follows, though many of the conditions listed in children/adolescents can also occur in adults with lower frequency, and vice versa:

=== Children/adolescents ===
- IgA nephropathy (Note: Contrast time of onset with Post-streptococcal Glomerulonephritis) - Most commonly diagnosed in children who recently had an upper respiratory tract infection (URTI). Symptoms typically present within 1–2 days of a non-specific URI with severe flank/abdominal pain, gross hematuria (characterized by dark brown or red colored urine), and edema of the hands, feet, and/or face.
- Post-streptococcal glomerulonephritis (PSGN) - Similar to IgA nephropathy, post-streptococcal glomerulonephritis (PSGN) most often occurs in children who have recently had an upper respiratory infection (URI). In contrast with IgA nephropathy, however, PSGN typically presents 2–3 weeks after recovering from an URI that was caused specifically by a Streptococcus bacteria. The symptoms at onset are very similar to IgA nephropathy and include abdominal pain, hematuria, edema, and oliguria.
- Henoch–Schönlein purpura (HSP) - Often considered a systemic form of IgA nephropathy, Henoch–Schönlein purpura (HSP) is a systemic small-vessel vasculitis that is characterized by deposition of IgA antibody immune complexes in different key areas throughout the body. Most often, the condition presents in children with palpable purpura, abdominal pain, and arthritis. When the kidneys are affected, the IgA immune complexes deposit in the glomerulus very similarly to IgA nephropathy and will present in a similar way.
- Hemolytic uremic syndrome - Most cases occur immediately following infectious diarrhea caused by a specific type of E. coli (O157:H7). The bacteria produces a toxin that causes widespread inflammation and numerous blood clots in small blood vessels (thrombotic microangiopathy). When the inflammation reaches the kidney, or the by-products of systemic inflammation build up in the kidney, the patient will begin showing signs of nephritic syndrome or potentially acute kidney failure (elevated creatinine, BUN, etc.).

=== Adults ===
- Goodpasture syndrome - This is a rare autoimmune disease where autoantibodies are produced that target the glomerular basement membrane in both the lungs and the kidneys. The damage to the basement membrane causes bleeding, and the disease often presents in patients as hematuria and haemoptysis (coughing up blood). If not treated promptly with plasmapharesis to remove the autoantibodies, it can lead to permanent damage in the lungs/kidneys.
- Systemic Lupus Erythematosus (SLE) - Better known as simply "Lupus", this autoimmune disease can affect nearly every major system in the human body and the kidneys are no exception. Autoantibodies produced in SLE can form immune complexes that deposit along the glomerular basement membrane and cause glomerular inflammation which leads to a nephritic syndrome.
- Rapidly progressive glomerulonephritis - This is a syndrome of the kidney that is characterized by rapid loss of kidney function (usually >50% decline in glomerular filtration rate (GFR) within 3 months) with glomerular crescent formation frequently seen on kidney biopsy. Without treatment, it will quickly lead to kidney failure and potentially death within months. This syndrome has numerous underlying causes that can also cause nephritic syndrome, so this may be more of an association than a cause.
- Infective endocarditis - Infection that affects the inner lining of the heart (endocardium) and can potentially cause a thrombus to form on one or more heart valves and, if left untreated, can cause septic emboli that can have many systemic effects, including deposition into the glomerulus, causing glomerulonephritis and nephritic syndrome.
- Cryoglobulinemia - Antibodies that are sensitive to the cold can become activated in cold conditions and cause an increase in blood viscosity (hyperviscosity syndrome) as well as forming immune complexes that can deposit in the small blood vessels and can cause nephritic syndrome when this occurs in the kidneys.
- Membranoproliferative glomerulonephritis (MPGN) - Another type of glomerulonephritis that is caused primarily by immune complex deposition in the glomerular mesangium and glomerular basement membrane thickening, which activates the complement cascade and damages the glomerulus. This damage leads to inflammation in the glomerulus and can present with a nephritic syndrome.
- Other ANCA small-vessel vasculitides - The conditions included in this category are eosinophilic granulomatosis with polyangiitis, microscopic polyangiitis, and granulomatosis with polyangiitis.

== Pathophysiology ==
The pathophysiology of nephritic syndrome is dependent on the underlying disease process, which can vary depending on what condition the nephritic syndrome is secondary to. More specifically, different diseases (many of which are mentioned above in the Causes section) affect different segments of the glomerulus and cause disease-specific segments of the glomerulus to become inflamed. Most often, it is dependent on what part of the glomerulus is damaged by antibody-antigen complex (immune complex) deposition. In all cases, however, the inflammatory processes in the glomerulus cause the capillaries to swell and the pores between podocytes become large enough that inappropriate contents in the blood plasma (i.e. red blood cells, protein, etc.) will begin to spill into the urine. This causes a decrease in glomerular filtration rate (GFR) and, if left untreated over time, will eventually produce uremic symptoms and retention of sodium and water in the body, leading to both edema and hypertension.

== Diagnosis ==
The diagnostic approach to nephritic syndrome includes evaluating the patient for any suspected underlying pathology that could cause a nephritic syndrome.

=== Physical examination ===
If the person in the office is being examined by a physician, some physical exam findings consistent with nephritic syndrome include the following:

- Edema - This could present as generalized edema (anasarca) or specific swelling of the hands, feet, and/or face.
- Other signs of fluid overload - Diffuse rales (crackles) may be heard at bilateral lung bases or diffusely in all lung fields on auscultation with a stethoscope. Jugular venous distention (JVD) may also be appreciated when visualizing the veins of the neck on physical exam.
- Elevated blood pressure - Measured at least two separate times with at least two minutes between measurements using a sphygmomanometer or equivalent method.
- Abnormal heart sounds - If the underlying cause is cardiac in nature (such as infective endocarditis), then you may appreciate abnormal heart sounds during auscultation of the heart.

=== Laboratory testing ===
If the physician is suspicious of a possible nephritic syndrome, then he/she may order some common lab tests including:

- Serum electrolytes - The kidney is one of the main regulators of electrolytes in the human body and measuring the different electrolyte levels using either a basic metabolic panel (BMP) or comprehensive metabolic panel (CMP) can be a useful indicator of the underlying pathology.
- Serum creatinine - Also measured using a BMP or CMP, creatinine is one of the most important indicators of current kidney function and is used to calculate the glomerular filtration rate (GFR). An elevated creatinine level is considered abnormal and may indicate decreased kidney function.
- Blood urea nitrogen (BUN) - Also measured using a BMP or CMP, blood urea nitrogen is an indicator of how much nitrogen is in the blood at the time of the phlebotomy. The kidney is responsible for excreting nitrogenous substances in the urine, so an elevated BUN usually indicates that the kidney is not functioning appropriately.
- Urinalysis - After the patient provides a urine specimen, it is sent to the lab for analysis using a variety of methods including urine dipstick testing and microscopic examination. Because the kidney is responsible for making urine, analyzing the urine directly can provide crucial data that can help the physician diagnose nephritic syndrome. Some findings on urinalysis that are consistent with nephritic syndrome include red blood cells (hematuria), red blood cell casts, proteinuria, and possibly white blood cells (pyuria).

If nephritic syndrome is identified and diagnosed, then it is important for the physician to determine the underlying cause. To do this, he/she may order any of a large variety of relevant lab tests, some of which are included here:

- Blood culture - This is the process where a sample of the patient's blood is sent to the microbiology lab to attempt to isolate and grow any bacteria that may be circulating in the blood, in order to identify the pathogen. This is helpful if the physician suspects infection as the underlying cause of the nephritic syndrome.
- Antinuclear antibody (ANA) titer - ANA is commonly positive in patients who have an underlying autoimmune disease, so this test is useful if the physician suspects an underlying autoimmune disease (refer to the Causes section above for examples) as the cause of the presenting nephritic syndrome. If positive, then the physician may order additional tests to determine which autoimmune condition is the cause and how best to treat it.
- Antiglomerular basement membrane (anti-GBM) antibody - If positive, this is highly indicative of Goodpasture's syndrome and can be used to guide treatment.
- Antineutrophil cytoplasmic antibody (ANCA) - If positive, this indicates that there is likely an underlying vasculitis that may be causing the acute nephritic syndrome.
- Serum complement (C3 and C4) - Complement factors bind to antibodies to form immune complexes and a decreased serum complement level could indicate that the complement is being consumed at a higher rate due to the formation of immune complexes leading to deposition in the glomerulus of the kidney.

=== Invasive testing ===
A kidney biopsy will provide a fully definitive diagnosis of nephritic syndrome and may also reveal the underlying cause of the nephritic syndrome depending on the underlying pathological process. On biopsy, a patient with nephritic syndrome would show inflammation of numerous glomeruli.

== Treatment ==
When a patient is confirmed to have nephritic syndrome, the main goal of treatment (regardless of the underlying cause) is to control elevated blood pressures and reduce active inflammation in the kidney itself. Most often, the patient will need to be admitted to the hospital for close monitoring to ensure the efficacy of treatment and make adjustments as needed. Some treatment modalities commonly used to meet these goals include:

- Bed rest during the recovery process to ensure administration of optimal medical therapy with as low of a risk as possible for any exacerbating factors (falls, infection, etc.).
- Fluid restriction to minimize the risk of edema (if not already present) or to reduce any active edema that may be present.
- A special diet during the hospital stay that restricts sodium, potassium, and fluids in conjunction with the previously mentioned fluid restriction in an attempt to control symptoms of fluid overload.
- Administration of diuretics if patient is showing signs of fluid overload. This will cause excess fluids to be excreted in the urine and may lessen the workload placed on the kidney, allowing it to recover from the inflammatory damage.
- Administration of antihypertensives to alleviate hypertension and maintain a normal blood pressure during the recovery process.
- Administration of anti-inflammatory medications (such as steroids or NSAIDs) to reduce active inflammation in the kidney.
- If the patient is showing signs of kidney failure or end-organ damage, the treatment team may opt to utilize kidney dialysis temporarily (or permanently, in some severe cases) to decrease stress on the kidneys and allow for optimal recovery.

Once the acute phase of the nephritic syndrome is controlled, it is crucial to determine the underlying pathology that caused the onset of the acute nephritic syndrome and to treat that condition. If the underlying cause is not determined and treated appropriately, it increases the risk of a recurrence of nephritic syndrome or chronic kidney disease (CKD) in the future.

== Prognosis ==
Because nephritic syndrome is a syndrome and not a disease, the prognosis depends on the underlying cause. Generally, the prognosis of nephritic syndrome in children is better than it is in adults.

== Epidemiology ==
According to the CDC, nephritis/nephrosis/nephritic syndrome was the 9th leading cause of death in the United States in 2017. It was listed as the cause of death for 50,633 out of the total 2,813,503 deaths reported in 2017.

=== Geography ===
The southeast region of the United States reported a significantly higher death rate due to kidney disease than any other region in 2017. Mississippi reported the highest death rate due to kidney disease (21.7), followed by Louisiana (20.6) and Arkansas (19.7). Although Vermont reported the lowest death rate due to kidney disease (3.3), the western United States reported the lowest regional average death rate due to kidney disease in 2017.

=== Gender ===
Out of the 1,374,392 female deaths reported in the US in 2017, kidney disease was listed as the cause of death for 24,889 women and was reported as the 9th overall cause of death for women in 2017.

Out of the 1,439,111 male deaths reported in the US in 2017, kidney disease was not listed in the top 10 causes of death.

=== Race and ethnicity ===
Out of the 2,378,385 deaths reported in individuals who identified as White, kidney disease was ranked 10th overall (39,105 deaths) in causes of death in the US in 2017.

Out of the 340,644 deaths reported in individuals who identified as Black or African American, kidney disease was ranked 8th overall (9,609 deaths) in causes of death in the US in 2017.

Out of the 74,094 deaths reported in individuals who identified as Asian or Pacific Islander, kidney disease was ranked 9th overall (1,563 deaths) in causes of death in the US in 2017.

Out of the 197,249 deaths reported in individuals who identified as Hispanic or Latino, kidney disease was ranked 10th overall (3,928 deaths) in causes of death in the US 2017.

=== Other countries ===
In a review of Romanian cases, a 10-year review yielded that upon biopsy, nephritic syndrome was the second most common clinical syndrome at 21.9% (nephrotic syndrome was 52.3%)
