= Pulmonary-renal syndrome =

Medical condition

Pulmonary-renal syndrome (PRS) is a rare medical syndrome in which respiratory failure involving bleeding in the lungs and kidney failure (glomerulonephritis) occur. PRS is associated with a high rate of morbidity and death. The term was first used by Goodpasture in 1919 to describe the association of respiratory and kidney failure.

== Causes ==
Pulmonary-renal syndromes are most commonly caused by an underlying autoimmune disease. PRS is most commonly due to ANCA-associated vasculitides (e.g., granulomatosis with polyangiitis) or due to anti-basement membrane diseases (e.g., Goodpasture's syndrome). Granulomatosis with polyangiitis usually presents with nasopharyngeal involvement as well, whereas Goodpasture's will not. Microscopic polyangiitis is the most common cause of pulmonary-renal syndrome.

Other causes include systemic lupus erythematosus, eosinophilic granulomatosis with polyangiitis, microscopic polyangiitis, dermatomyositis, polymyositis, mixed connective tissue disease, poststreptococcal glomerulonephritis, rheumatoid arthritis, and systemic sclerosis. Less common causes also include IgA vasculitis and cryoglobulinemic vasculitis.

Other etiologies include toxic injury such as paraquat poisoning, infection with hantavirus, leptospirosis, or legionella, or vascular, as seen in nephrotic syndrome when a renal vein thrombosis embolizes to the lungs.

== Diagnosis ==
=== Differential diagnosis ===
Cardiogenic shock can mimic a pulmonary renal syndrome and lead to coughing up blood due to pulmonary edema and kidney failure from inadequate blood flow.

== Treatment ==
Treatment is primarily with corticosteroids and immunosuppressive medications like cyclophosphamide, methotrexate, and azathioprine. Plasmapheresis can be used in some circumstances.
