= Diffuse proliferative nephritis =

- Other names: Glomerulonephritis
- Specialty: Nephrology

Diffuse proliferative glomerulonephritis (DPGN) is a type of glomerulonephritis that is the most serious form of renal lesions in SLE and is also the most common, occurring in 35% to 60% of patients. In absence of SLE, DPGN pathology looks more like Membranoproliferative glomerulonephritis

In DPGN Most of the glomeruli show endothelial and mesangial proliferation, affecting the entire glomerulus, leading to diffuse hypercellularity of the glomeruli, producing in some cases epithelial crescents that fill Bowman's space. When extensive, immune complexes create an overall thickening of the capillary wall, resembling rigid "wire loops" on routine light microscopy. Immune complexes can be visualized by staining with fluorescent antibodies directed against immunoglobulins or complement, resulting in a granular fluorescent staining pattern. Electron microscopy reveals electron-dense subendothelial immune complexes (between endothelium and basement membrane). In due course, glomerular injury in DPGN gives rise to scarring (glomerulosclerosis). Most of SLE patients with DPGN have hematuria with moderate to severe proteinuria, hypertension, and renal insufficiency.

== Signs and symptoms ==
Symptoms can be caused directly from DPGN or from a different disease that is causing DPGN. Many of the symptoms, like edema and hypertension, occur due to the decrease in glomerular filtration rate.

Patients can experience general systemic symptoms including fatigue, vomiting, nausea. These would all indicate uremia.

Other patients can experience:

- Decreased urine output
- Hematuria
  - Microscopic or gross
- Proteinuria
  - Which will present as frothy urine
- Pedal edema
  - Swelling of the feet and ankles

=== DPGN caused by other diseases ===
If a patient has DPGN due to IgA nephropathy (Berger Disease) then they can experience flank pain, gross hematuria, and upper respiratory infections.

If a patient has DPGN with underlying anti-GBM then they can experience alveolar hemorrhage and respiratory issues.

If a patient has DPGN with an underlying autoimmune disease then the patient can experience photosensitivity, rash, joint pains, serositis, and oral ulcers.

== Cause ==
The cause of diffuse proliferative glomerulonephritis (DPGN) depends on the severity of the disease. DPGN is a secondary disease, in that a disease that a patient already has causes DPGN to occur. The most common associated disease of DPGN is severe systemic lupus erythematosus(SLE). Specifically, Lupus nephritis class IV. The other commonly associated disease is Immunoglobulin A (IgA) nephropathy. Post-infectious glomerulonephritis can also be caused by bacterial or viral infections. Streptococcal throat or skin infection is most commonly seen as the origin if glomerulonephritis is going to be caused by an infection. Other causes of DPGN are endocarditis, Hepatitis B, and Hepatis C.

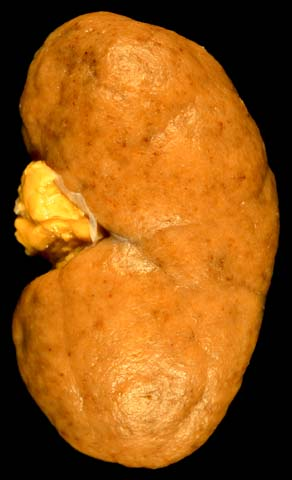
Diffuse Proliferative Lupus Nephritis class IV

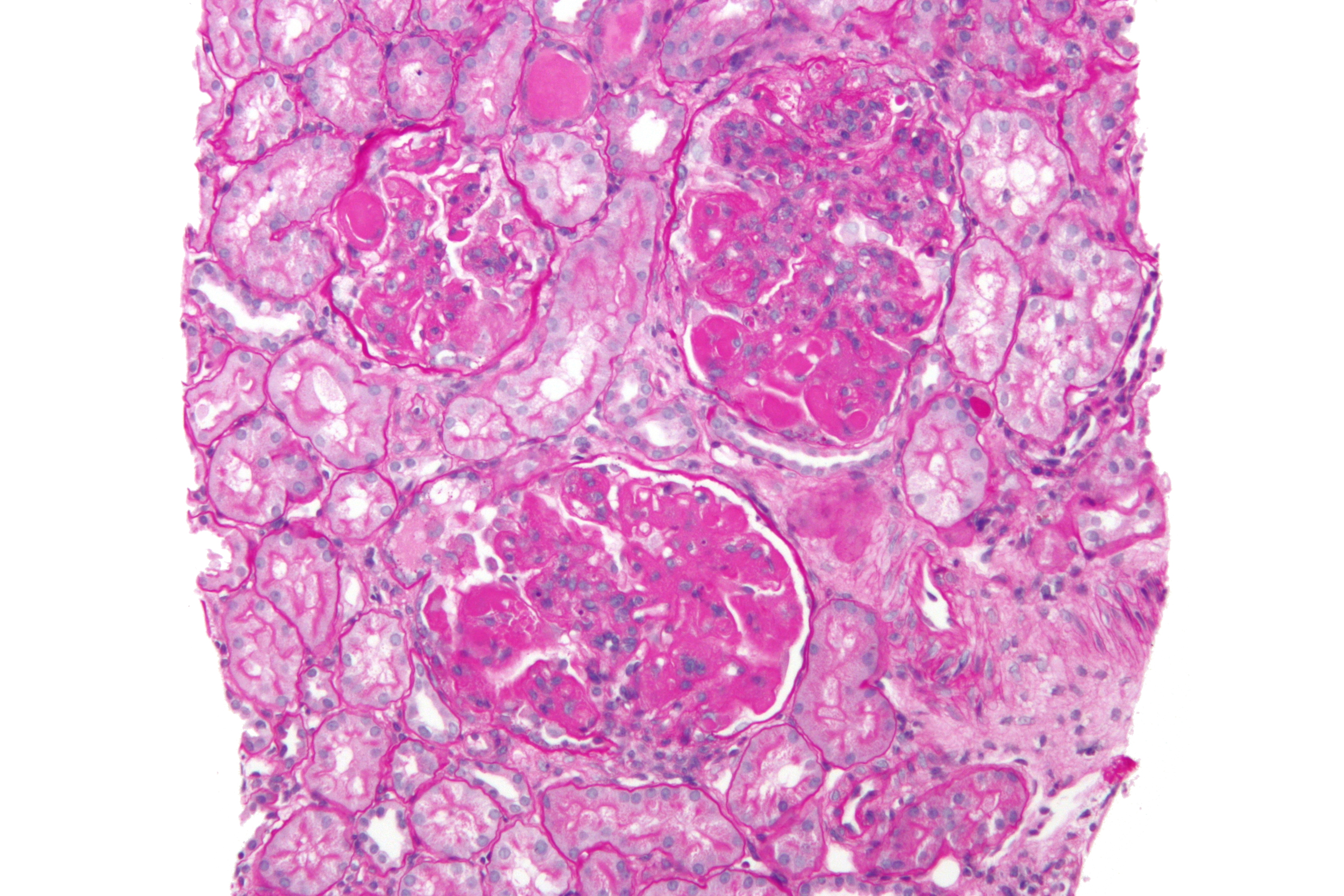
Micrograph image of increased mesangial matrix and mesangial hypercellularity due to diffuse proliferative lupus nephritis

== Pathophysiology ==
The etiology plays a role in the specific mechanism of DPGN. Usually the deposition of immune-complexes (antigen-antibody complex) that activates the complement system are involved. The antibodies that form immune complexes deposits or they bind directly to the nonglomerular antibodies present. Immune-complexes are combinations of DNA, anti-dsDNA ubiquitin, and other proteins in DPGN that are associated with lupus nephritis. C1q, the first component of the complement system, encounters conformational change that leads to C3 convertase breaking C3 into C3a and C3b. C3a, C5a, IL-8 are all chemotactic factors of the activated complement system. Part of their role is to recruit polymorphonuclear cells and leukocytes. Interleukins like IL-6, tumor necrosis factor-alpha, and interferon-gamma, that cause cell injury, are released. Mesangial proliferation is caused by activated platelets. Another mechanism involves antibodies formed against alpha-3 chain of collagen IV. Their deposition occurs in the sub-epithelial spaces. This causes proteinuria by damaging the basement membrane and creating a loss of negative charge. These are anionic deposits that fail to cross the membrane.

Cationic deposits that cross the membrane are then deposited into sub-epithelial spaces. Then the disease advances and crescents are formed. Crescents are a combination of epithelial cells, activated macrophages, and fibrin. They lead to rupturing of small blood vessels, ultimately causing necrosis and sclerosis.

=== Basic Summary ===
The glomeruli are the filters in the kidneys. When working normally they will move the waste, excess electrolytes, and unnecessary fluid from the bloodstream to the urine. When a person develops DPGN, over 50% of the glomeruli (diffuse) become inflamed. There is also an increase in mesangial, epithelial, and endothelial (proliferative) cells. Inflammatory cells are also rapidly developed. This causes damage to the kidneys and does not allow for proper filtration.

== Diagnosis ==
The presentation of all types glomerulonephritis are the same. If a patient is suspected to have DPGN, a blood and urine test will be done first. A urine test will be done to determine if there is protein or blood in the urine. A blood test will be to measure the levels of creatine in the blood. An ultrasound will be done to see if there is inflammation of the kidneys and to look for blockages.

A kidney biopsy is the most important diagnostic tool. With a biopsy, the sample will be looked at histologically. With this information, a proper diagnosis can be completed. There are many forms of glomerulonephritis, but under a microscope, DPGN will show increased cell count of polymorphonuclear cells, cellular crescents, and fibrinoid necrosis. A patient with DPGN will have more than 50% of their glomeruli involved. If a patient has DPGN, that means they have an active form of glomerulonephritis.

== Treatment ==
Treatment of DPGN depends on the severity of the disease. An optimal treatment for DPGN is immunosuppressive therapy. Two common immunosuppressive drugs used to treat DPGN are cyclophosphamide (CYC) and mycophenolate mofetil (MMF) if the DPGN is caused by SLE. CYC and MMF both preserve the renal function in patients with SLE and DPGN. CYC and MMF have been known to improve proteinuria. There can be adverse side effects; including CYC can cause infertility in both women and men. MMF has been seen to have less drug toxicity. There are a variety of dosing options (oral or intravenous medications) available.

If the DPGN is caused by IgA nephropathy then corticosteroids, angiotensin-converting enzyme inhibitor (ACEIs), angiotensin receptor blockers (ARBs), or both ACEIs and ARBs should be used. Corticosteroids are used to suppress the immune system and to reduce inflammation. ACEIs will decrease hypertension by preventing the body from creating angiotensin II, which narrows the blood vessels. ARBs block angiotensin II from acting.

The patient's diet should also be changed. The patient should restrict salt intake to improve the hypertension and nephrosis. Protein restriction may reduce the progression of the disease. Fluid restriction may also be necessary if the patient is experiencing edema.

Renal corpuscle with many details including the glomerulus, glomerular capillaries, and Bowman's capsule. The glomeruli are filters in the kidneys. It is when the glomeruli become inflamed and stop filtering correctly when a person can get a type of glomerulonephritis.

== Prognosis ==
Prognosis is determined by the stage of the disease. Aggressive therapy is recommended to avoid progressing to end-stage renal disease (ESRD), which is a strong possibility. About 10% of DPGN patients will go into ESRD.

If the biopsy shows the presence of crescents, tubule-interstitial injury with inflammation atrophy and fibrosis, the outcome is worse. Other factors that will influence the survival rate are the severity of proteinuria, blood urea nitrogen levels, serum creatine levels, and eGFR. Other bad prognosis features are the presence of hypertension, accelerated hematuria, and hypoalbuminemia. Males are at a higher risk factor than females. Overall, about 50% of patients with DPGN require daily dialysis within 6–12 months after disease presentation.

The percentage of glomeruli that show crescents usually correlates to the severity of the renal failure.

The survival rate after 5 years is about 30%.

== Epidemiology ==
DPGN prevalence varies among races. Whites are the less likely to have DPGN (12-33%); while African Americans (40-69%), Hispanics (36-61%), and Asians (47-53%) are more likely to develop it.

Men are more likely to develop a more aggressive disease than women. However, women are nine times more likely to develop DPGN.

DPGN occurs in all age groups, but is more prevalent in women of childbearing years. Eighty-five percent of patients develop DPGN before 55 years.

=== End Stage Renal Disease ===
- About 38% of people with ESRD will be diagnosed with DPGN.
- In the United States, about 4.5 per million cases of ESRD are caused by DPGN.

== Research Directions ==
In 2014 a study was completed to diagnose glomerulonephritis based on etiology. Using immunofluorescence and light microscopy, the investigators were determining the classification for the disease based on if the disease was immune complex mediated, pauci- immune, or complement mediated. They then looked at the complement factors and immunoglobulin deposits to identify the underlying cause. The aims of this study were classifying pathophysiology and to obtain a better understanding of glomerulonephritis.

Much of the research within the last 10 years has been to identify the best treatment for DPGN. Other studies about DPGN from the past 10 years has included studies for other diseases that are linked to DPGN. There are no current clinical trials for DPGN happening.

=== Future Studies ===
Activating complement pathways plays a large role in mediating inflammation. The classical pathway, lectin pathway, and alternative pathway of complement are all involved in glomerulonephritis, depending on the etiology. Inactive and active complement proteins that split fragments are found in the glomeruli. There are currently drugs available that will target the complement pathway. It has been proposed that if fluorescently tagged antibodies were used to target different split products of the complement proteins, then identification of specific pathways involved and the accumulated complement proteins in the glomeruli should be achievable. This would lead to identifying which pathways and proteins drive each type of glomerulonephritis.
