= Rapidly progressive glomerulonephritis =

- Other names: Crescentic glomerulonephritis
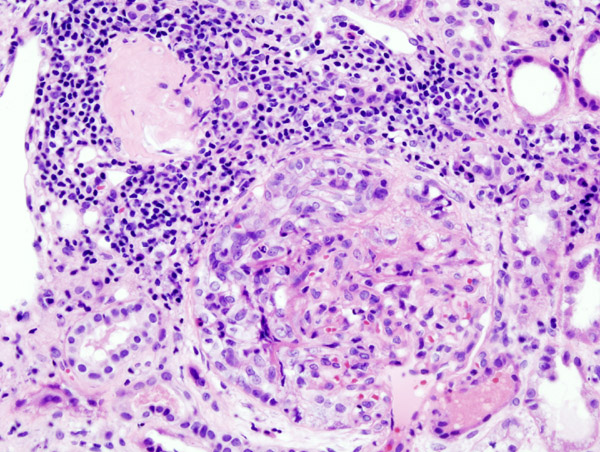
- Histopathological image of crescentic glomerulonephritis in a patient with MPO-ANCA positive rapid progressive glomerulonephritis. Hematoxylin & eosin stain.
- Specialty: Nephrology
- Symptoms: Hematuria
- Types: Type I, II and III
- Diagnostic method: Serum analysis
- Treatment: Corticosteroids

Rapidly progressive glomerulonephritis (RPGN) is a syndrome of the kidney that is characterized by a rapid loss of kidney function, (usually a 50% decline in the glomerular filtration rate (GFR) within 3 months) with glomerular crescent formation seen in at least 50% or 75% of glomeruli seen on kidney biopsies. If left untreated, it rapidly progresses into acute kidney failure and death within months. In 50% of cases, RPGN is associated with an underlying disease such as Goodpasture syndrome, systemic lupus erythematosus or granulomatosis with polyangiitis; the remaining cases are idiopathic. Regardless of the underlying cause, RPGN involves severe injury to the kidneys' glomeruli, with many of the glomeruli containing characteristic glomerular crescents (crescent-shaped scars).

== Signs and symptoms ==
Most types of RPGN are characterized by severe and rapid loss of kidney function with marked hematuria; red blood cell casts in the urine; and proteinuria sometimes exceeding three grams in twenty-four hours, a combination of signs associated with nephritic syndrome. Some patients also experience hypertension and edema. Severe disease is characterized by pronounced oliguria or anuria, which portends a poor prognosis.

== Pathophysiology ==
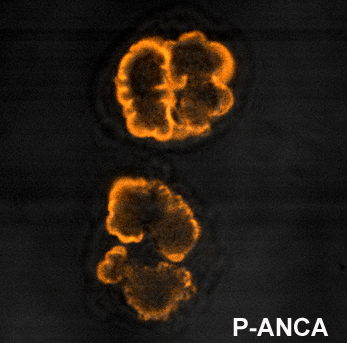

It is thought that antineutrophil cytoplasmic antibodies (ANCA) interact with antigens in the cytoplasm of neutrophils to cause an early degranulation, triggering the release of lytic enzymes at the site of injury and leading to the formation of glomerular crescents that consist primarily of parietal epithelial cells from Bowman's capsule and in some cases podocytes.

== Diagnosis ==
Serum analysis often aids in the diagnosis of a specific underlying disease. The presence of anti-glomerular basement membrane (GBM) antibodies suggests type I RPGN; antinuclear antibodies (ANA) may support a diagnosis of systemic lupus erythematosus and type II RPGN; and type III and idiopathic RPGN are frequently associated with anti-neutrophil cytoplasmic antibodies (ANCA)-positive serum.

Impaired kidney function in an individual who has had the condition for fewer than three months is characteristic of RPGN. An ultrasonographic examination of the abdomen should be obtained. Although the presence of sediment in the urine on examination can indicate proliferative glomerulonephritis, many cases of rapidly progressive glomerulonephritis need a renal biopsy to make a diagnosis.

=== Classification ===
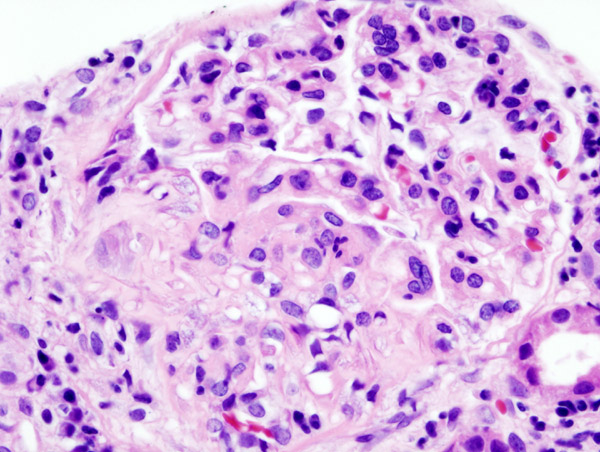
Crescentic glomerulonephritis

RPGN can be classified into three types, based upon the immunofluorescence patterns:

==== Type I ====
Accounting for approximately 3% of RPGN, type I RPGN, also called anti-GBM glomerulonephritis, is characterized by the presence of autoantibodies directed against type IV collagen (specifically, the noncollagenous region of its α_{3} chain) in the glomerular basement membrane (GBM). Some cases are associated with antibodies directed against the basement membrane of lung alveoli, producing Goodpasture syndrome. The majority of type I disease, however, features anti-GBM antibodies alone; these cases are considered idiopathic.

==== Type II ====
Characterized by deposition of immune complexes in glomerular tissues, type II RPGN accounts for 40% of cases. Any immune complex disease—including systemic lupus erythematosus, acute proliferative glomerulonephritis, Henoch–Schönlein purpura, and IgA nephropathy—that involves the glomerulus may progress to RPGN if severe enough.

==== Type III ====
Also known as pauci-immune RPGN, type III RPGN accounts for 55% of RPGN and features neither immune complex deposition nor anti-GBM antibodies. Instead, the glomeruli are damaged in an undefined manner, perhaps through the activation of neutrophils in response to ANCA. Type III RPGN may be isolated to the glomerulus (primary, or idiopathic) or associated with a systemic disease (secondary). In most cases of the latter, the systemic disease is an ANCA-associated vasculitis such as granulomatosis with polyangiitis, microscopic polyangiitis or eosinophilic granulomatosis with polyangiitis.

== Treatment ==
Therapy consists of a combination of rituximab, corticosteroids, and cyclophosphamide, with a substitution of azathioprine for cyclophosphamide after a ninety-day initial period being another option. When remission is achieved, immunosuppressants are still used, usually corticosteroids with azathioprine or rituximab infusions.

== Epidemiology ==
The incidence rate of rapidly progressive glomerulonephritis is approximately 3.9 individuals per million.
