= C-ANCA =

Type of autoantibody

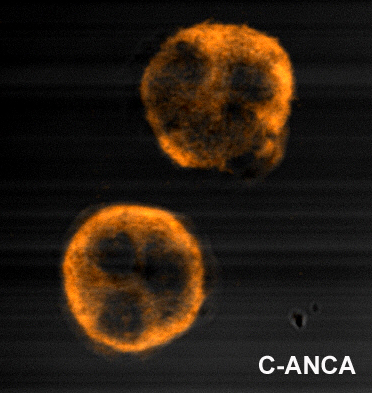
The granular, cytoplasmic staining pattern of c-ANCA

c-ANCAs, or PR3-ANCA, or antineutrophil cytoplasmic antibodies, are a type of autoantibody, an antibody produced by the body that acts against one of its own proteins. These antibodies show a diffusely granular, cytoplasmic staining pattern under microscopy. This pattern results from binding of ANCAs to antigen targets throughout the neutrophil cytoplasm, the most common protein target being proteinase 3 (PR3). For example, PR3 is the most common antigen target of ANCA in patients with granulomatosis with polyangiitis. In active granulomatosis with polyangiitis, c-ANCA is found over 90% of the time.

== See also ==
- P-ANCA
- Anti-Neutrophil Cytoplasmic Antibody (ANCA)
