= Pauci-immune =

- Specialty: Rheumatology

Pauci-immune (pauci- Latin: few, little) vasculitis is a form of vasculitis that is associated with minimal evidence of hypersensitivity upon immunofluorescent staining for IgG. Often, this is discovered in the setting of the kidney.

When the glomeruli of the kidney from a patient with symptoms of proliferative nephritis are examined under the microscope, crescents will be normally observed. When these are subjected to immunofluorescence, three patterns can be observed: linear, granular and negative (pauci-immune). The linear and granular patterns are examples of positive immunofluorescence that are associated as follows: Goodpasture syndrome (linear pattern), post-streptococcal glomerulonephritis (granular), and diffuse proliferative nephritis (granular). The negative immunofluorescence pattern, however, is called "pauci-immune" and is often associated with systemic vasculitides (plural of vasculitis) including: microscopic polyangiitis, eosinophilic granulomatosis with polyangiitis (EGPA), and granulomatosis with polyangiitis (GPA).

In the setting of systemic vasculitis as described above, proliferative nephritis is associated with antineutrophil cytoplasmic antibodies (ANCA). Because of this, an ANCA test should always follow a negative immunofluorescence result to have the highest accuracy for confirming pauci-immune vasculitis-driven proliferative nephritis.

Some cases of pauci-immune proliferative nephritis have no explanation and are thus deemed "idiopathic."

Peak incidences in 50- to 60-year-olds symptoms include intermittent fever / weight loss / shortness of breath / joint pain.

== See also ==
- Systemic vasculitis#Pauci-immune
- Goodpasture Syndrome and Poststrep Glomerulonephritis
- Microscopic polyangiitis, Eosinophilic granulomatosis with polyangiitis or Granulomatosis with polyangiitis
