= Avacopan =

Chemical compound

Clinical data
- Trade names: Tavneos
- Other names: CCX168
- AHFS/Drugs.com: Monograph
- MedlinePlus: a622023
- License data: US DailyMed: Avacopan
- Pregnancy category: AU: D
- Routes of administration: By mouth
- Drug class: Complement C5a receptor antagonist
- ATC code: L04AJ05 (WHO)

Legal status
- Legal status: AU: S4 (Prescription only); CA: ℞-only; UK: POM (Prescription only); US: ℞-only; EU: Rx-only (revoked); Rx-only

Identifiers
- IUPAC name: (2R,3S)-2-{4-[(cyclopentyl)amino]phenyl}-1-(2-fluoro-6-methylbenzoyl)-N-(3-(trifluoromethyl)-4-methylphenyl)piperidine-3-carboxamide
- CAS Number: 1346623-17-3
- PubChem CID: 49841217
- DrugBank: DB15011
- ChemSpider: 52083514
- UNII: O880NM097T
- KEGG: D11093
- ChEMBL: ChEMBL3989871
- PDB ligand: EFD (PDBe, RCSB PDB)
- CompTox Dashboard (EPA): DTXSID701102660
- ECHA InfoCard: 100.351.344

Chemical and physical data
- Formula: C_{33}H_{35}F_{4}N_{3}O_{2}
- Molar mass: 581.656 g·mol^{−1}
- 3D model (JSmol): Interactive image
- SMILES: Cc1ccc(NC(=O)[C@H]2CCCN(C(=O)c3c(C)cccc3F)[C@H]2c2ccc(NC3CCCC3)cc2)cc1C(F)(F)F
- InChI: InChI=1S/C33H35F4N3O2/c1-20-12-15-25(19-27(20)33(35,36)37)39-31(41)26-10-6-18-40(32(42)29-21(2)7-5-11-28(29)34)30(26)22-13-16-24(17-14-22)38-23-8-3-4-9-23/h5,7,11-17,19,23,26,30,38H,3-4,6,8-10,18H2,1-2H3,(H,39,41)/t26-,30-/m0/s1; Key:PUKBOVABABRILL-YZNIXAGQSA-N

Avacopan, sold under the brand name Tavneos, is a medication used to treat anti-neutrophil cytoplasmic autoantibody-associated vasculitis. Avacopan is a complement 5a receptor antagonist and a cytochrome P450 3A4 inhibitor.

The most common side effects include nausea (feeling sick), headache, decrease in white blood cell count, upper respiratory tract (nose and throat) infection, diarrhea, vomiting, and nasopharyngitis (inflammation of the nose and throat).

Avacopan was approved for medical use in Japan in September 2021, and in the United States in October 2021. It is the first orally-administered inhibitor of the complement C5a receptor approved by the US Food and Drug Administration (FDA). The FDA considers it to be a first-in-class medication.

Since early 2026, avacopan has been reported to have severe side effects, namely drug-induced liver injury (DILI) that involves destruction of intrahepatic small bile ducts, also known as vanishing bile duct syndrome (VBDS). US FDA has identified 76 patients with DILI, of which 56 required hospitalization, and 7 patients died. The Japanese manufacturer Kissei Pharmaceutical recommends that avacopan no longer be prescribed, with 20 deaths reported in all 8503 Japanese patients due to this adverse effect. On 26 June 2026, the European Medicines Agency’s (EMA) Committee for Medicinal Products forHuman Use (CHMP) issued an opinion recommending the revocation of the EU marketing authorisation for TAVNEOS., and the European liscence holder has stated that they expect " to cease new patient initiation in the EU and EEA markets, consistent with regulatory guidance."

FDA CDER has proposed a withdrawal of this medication on April 27, 2026, in conjunction with the safety issue, citing a recent discovery in manipulation of phase 3 trial endpoint results that made the medication statistically significant in effectiveness, while the original analysis did not support this conclusion. Currently avacopan remains on the market, until the manufacturer decides to withdrawal, or FDA commissioner mandates the removal of the drug from the market.

== Medical uses ==
In the United States, avacopan is indicated as an adjunctive treatment of adults with severe active anti-neutrophil cytoplasmic autoantibody-associated vasculitis (granulomatosis with polyangiitis and microscopic polyangiitis) in combination with standard therapy including glucocorticoids.

In the European Union, avacopan, in combination with a rituximab or cyclophosphamide regimen has been indicated for the treatment of adults with severe, active granulomatosis with polyangiitis or microscopic polyangiitis.

== History ==
Avacopan (ChemoCentryx code name: CCX168) was discovered and developed by ChemoCentryx Inc., a California-based biotech company, which was acquired by Amgen in 2022, one year after the FDA approval of TAVNEOS (avacopan).

The FDA approved avacopan based on evidence from a clinical trial of 330 participants with severe active anti-neutrophil cytoplasmic autoantibody-associated vasculitis. In the clinical trial, participants were randomly assigned to receive avacopan or placebo for 52 weeks. Participants in the placebo group received a glucocorticoid taper over 20 weeks. Neither the participants nor healthcare providers knew which medication was being given. Participants in both groups received background immunosuppressive treatment (cyclophosphamide or rituximab) and were allowed to receive additional glucocorticoids. The benefit of avacopan in comparison to placebo was assessed by proportion of participants who achieved remission at week 26 and sustained remission at week 52. Data from this trial were also analyzed for the assessment of side effects. The trial was conducted at 143 sites in 18 countries including the United States. This trial assessed both efficacy and safety. In the clinical trial, a greater proportion of participants who received avacopan for one year with other medicines (including glucocorticoids) achieved sustained disease remission compared to participants who received other medicines without avacopan. The proportion of participants who achieved remission after six months of treatment was similar.

== Society and culture ==
=== Legal status ===
In November 2021, the Committee for Medicinal Products for Human Use (CHMP) of the European Medicines Agency adopted a positive opinion, recommending the granting of a marketing authorization for the medicinal product Tavneos, intended, in combination with a rituximab or cyclophosphamide regimen, for the treatment of adults with severe, active granulomatosis with polyangiitis or microscopic polyangiitis. The applicant for this medicinal product is Vifor Fresenius Medical Care Renal Pharma France. The EMA considers avacopan to be a first-in-class medicine. Avacopan was approved for medical use in the European Union in January 2022.

The US Food and Drug Administration (FDA) granted the application for avacopan orphan drug designation.

In January 2026, the CHMP started a review of Tavneos following emerging information that raises questions regarding the data integrity of the main study supporting the medicine's marketing authorization in the EU. The review of Tavneos was initiated at the request of the European Commission, under Article 20 of Regulation (EC) No 726/2004. In 2026, following post-marketing analysis and review, there are reports of 76 drug-induced liver injury (DILI) injuries and eight deaths potentially linked to the drug, biopsy confirming the presence of vanishing bile duct syndrome in seven cases. In June 2026, the CHMP finalized its review of Tavneos (avacopan) and has recommended that the medicine's marketing authorization in the EU be revoked because its benefits are no longer proven to outweigh its risks.

In April 2026, the US FDA announced intent to withdraw approval of Tavneos due to irregularities in clinical trials and material untruths in the application.

=== Names ===
Avacopan is the international nonproprietary name.
