= P-ANCA =

Type of autoantibody

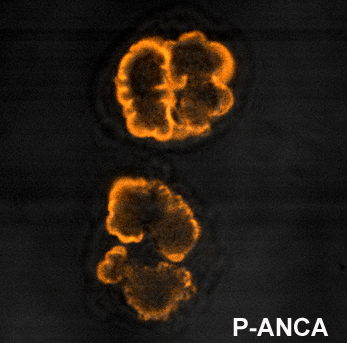
Perinuclear staining typical of p-ANCA

p-ANCA, or MPO-ANCA, or perinuclear anti-neutrophil cytoplasmic antibodies, are antibodies that stain the material around the nucleus of a neutrophil. They are a special class of anti-neutrophil cytoplasmic antibodies.

This pattern occurs because the vast majority of the antigens targeted by ANCAs are highly cationic (positively charged) at pH 7.00. During ethanol (pH ~7.0 in water) fixation, antigens which are more cationic migrate and localize around the nucleus, attracted by its negatively charged DNA content. Antibody staining therefore results in fluorescence of the region around the nucleus.

== Targets ==
p-ANCAs stain the perinuclear region by binding to specific targets. By far the most common p-ANCA target is myeloperoxidase (MPO), a neutrophil granule protein whose primary role in normal metabolic processes is generation of oxygen radicals.

ANCA will less commonly form against alternative antigens that may also result in a p-ANCA pattern. These include lactoferrin, elastase, and cathepsin G.

When the condition is a vasculitis, the target is usually MPO. However, the proportion of p-ANCA sera with anti-MPO antibodies has been reported to be as low as 12%.

== Medical conditions ==
p-ANCA is associated with several medical conditions:

- It is fairly specific, but not sensitive for ulcerative colitis, so is not useful as a sole diagnostic test. When measured together with anti-saccharomyces cerevisiae antibodies (ASCA), p-ANCA has been estimated to have a specificity of 97% and a sensitivity of 48% in differentiating patients with ulcerative colitis from normal controls.
- Approximately 50% of cases of eosinophilic granulomatosis with polyangiitis
- A majority of primary sclerosing cholangitis
- Microscopic polyangiitis
- Focal necrotizing and crescentic glomerulonephritis
- Rheumatoid arthritis

== See also ==
- C-ANCA
- Anti-neutrophil cytoplasmic antibody (ANCA)
