= PR3 =

PR3 may refer to:

- Polskie Radio Program III, a radio channel broadcast by the Polish public broadcaster Polskie Radio
- The third of three categories of para-rowing, also known as adaptive rowing
- Proteinase 3, a serine protease enzyme expressed mainly in neutrophil granulocytes

PR-3 may refer to:

- Puerto Rico Highway 3
