= Myeloblastin =

Class of enzymes

Identifiers
- EC no.: 3.4.21.76
- CAS no.: 128028-50-2

Databases
- IntEnz: IntEnz view
- BRENDA: BRENDA entry
- ExPASy: NiceZyme view
- KEGG: KEGG entry
- MetaCyc: metabolic pathway
- PRIAM: profile
- PDB structures: RCSB PDB PDBe PDBsum
Search
- PMC: articles
- PubMed: articles
- NCBI: proteins

Myeloblastin (EC 3.4.21.76, leukocyte proteinase 3, leukocyte proteinase 4, proteinase PR-3, proteinase-3, PMNL proteinase) is an enzyme. This enzyme catalyses the following chemical reaction: Hydrolysis of proteins, including elastin, by preferential cleavage: -Ala- > -Val-

This enzyme is present in polymorphonuclear leukocyte granules. Downregulation of myeloblastin in promyelocytic leukemia cells was shown to induce their growth arrest and differentiation.

== See also ==
- Proteinase 3
