= Urinary cast =

Cylindrical protein structure in urine in certain disease states

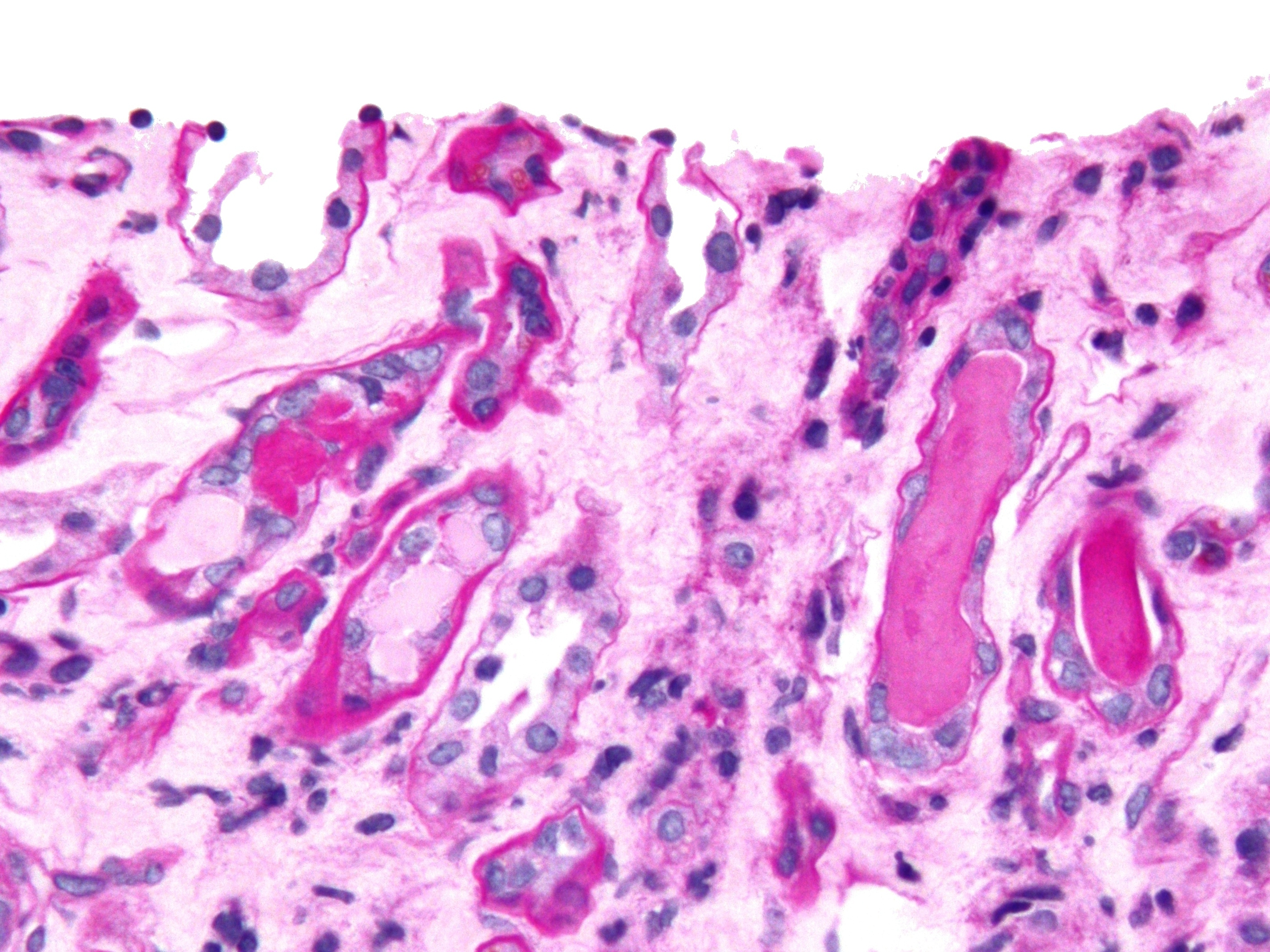
Micrograph showing casts in a kidney biopsy using PAS stain: Hyaline casts are PAS-positive (dark pink/red, right of image). Myelomatous casts are PAS-negative (pale pink, left of image)

Urinary casts are microscopic cylindrical structures produced by the kidney and present in the urine in certain disease states. They form in the distal convoluted tubule and collecting ducts of nephrons, then dislodge and pass into the urine, where they can be detected by microscopy.

They form via precipitation of Tamm–Horsfall mucoprotein, which is secreted by renal tubule cells, and sometimes also by albumin in conditions of proteinuria. Cast formation is pronounced in environments favoring protein denaturation and precipitation (low flow, concentrated salts, low pH). Tamm–Horsfall protein is particularly susceptible to precipitation in these conditions.

Casts were first described by Henry Bence Jones (1813–1873).

As reflected in their cylindrical form, casts are generated in the small distal convoluted tubules and collecting ducts of the kidney, and generally maintain their shape and composition as they pass through the urinary system. Although the most common forms are benign, others indicate disease. All rely on the inclusion or adhesion of various elements on a mucoprotein base—the hyaline cast. "Cast" itself merely describes the shape, so an adjective is added to describe the composition of the cast. Various casts found in urine sediment may be classified as:

== Overview table ==
Main types of urinary casts:

Type	Main causes
Acellular casts
Hyaline	Nonspecific
Granular	Exercise or dehydration; Acute tubular necrosis
Waxy	Advanced chronic kidney disease
Fatty	Various types of tubulointerstitial disorders, in large numbers, strongly suggest nephrotic syndrome.
Pigment	Acute kidney injury secondary to hemolysis or rhabdomyolysis; Acute tubular necrosis
Cellular casts
Red blood cell	Glomerulonephritis
White blood cell casts	Pyelonephritis or other type of tubulointerstitial inflammation; Proliferative glomerulonephritis
Epithelial cell casts	Acute tubular injury; Glomerulonephritis; Nephrotic syndrome

== Acellular casts ==
=== Hyaline casts ===
The most common type of cast, hyaline casts are solidified Tamm–Horsfall mucoprotein secreted from the tubular epithelial cells of individual nephrons. Low urine flow, concentrated urine, or an acidic environment can contribute to the formation of hyaline casts, and as such, they may be seen in normal individuals in dehydration or vigorous exercise. Hyaline casts are cylindrical and clear, with a low refractive index, so they can easily be missed on cursory review under brightfield microscopy, or in an aged sample where dissolution has occurred whereas, though, phase contrast microscopy leads to easier identification. Given the ubiquitous presence of Tamm–Horsfall protein, other cast types are formed via the inclusion or adhesion of other elements to the hyaline base.

In individuals with intact renal function, the detection of up to two hyaline casts per low-power field on microscopic urinalysis is considered physiologically normal; values exceeding this threshold frequently signify renal stress or early dysfunction, most commonly prerenal azotemia or increased tubular concentration secondary to dehydration.

=== Granular casts ===
The second-most common type of cast, granular casts can result either from the breakdown of cellular casts or the inclusion of aggregates of plasma proteins (e.g., albumin) or immunoglobulin light chains. Depending on the size of inclusions, they can be classified as fine or coarse, though the distinction has no diagnostic significance. Their appearance is generally more cigar-shaped and of a higher refractive index than hyaline casts. While most often indicative of chronic renal disease, these casts, as with hyaline casts, can also be seen for a short time following strenuous exercise. The "muddy brown cast" seen in acute tubular necrosis is a type of granular cast.

=== Waxy casts ===
Thought to represent the end product of cast evolution, waxy casts suggest the very low urine flow associated with severe, longstanding kidney disease such as kidney failure. Additionally, due to urine stasis and their formation in diseased, dilated ducts, these casts are significantly larger than hyaline casts.

- They are cylindrical.
- They possess a higher refractive index.
- They are more rigid, demonstrating sharp edges, fractures, and broken-off ends.

Waxy casts are broad casts, which is a more general term to describe the wider cast product of a dilated duct, and are seen in chronic kidney failure.

In nephrotic syndrome, many additional types of casts exist, including broad and waxy casts if the condition is chronic (this is referred to as a telescopic urine with the presence of many casts).

=== Fatty casts ===
Formed by the breakdown of lipid-rich epithelial cells, these are hyaline casts with fat globule inclusions, yellowish-tan in color. If cholesterol or cholesterol esters are present, they are associated with the "Maltese cross" sign under polarized light. They are pathognomonic for high urinary protein nephrotic syndrome.

=== Pigment casts ===
Formed by the adhesion of metabolic breakdown products or drug pigments, these casts are so named due to their discoloration. Pigments include those produced endogenously, such as hemoglobin in hemolytic anemia, myoglobin in rhabdomyolysis, and bilirubin in liver disease. Drug pigments, such as phenazopyridine, may also cause cast discoloration.

=== Crystal casts ===
Though crystallized urinary solutes, such as oxalates, urates, or sulfonamides, may become enmeshed within a ketanaline cast during its formation, the clinical significance of this occurrence is not felt to be great.

== Cellular casts ==
=== Red blood cell casts ===
The presence of red blood cells within the cast is always pathological and is strongly indicative of granulomatosis with polyangiitis, systemic lupus erythematosus, post-streptococcal glomerulonephritis, or Goodpasture's syndrome. They can also be associated with renal infarction and subacute bacterial endocarditis. They are a yellowish-brown color and are generally cylindrical with sometimes ragged edges; their fragility makes inspection of a fresh sample necessary. They are usually associated with nephritic syndromes or urinary tract injury.

=== White blood cell casts ===
Indicative of inflammation or infection, the presence of white blood cells within or upon casts strongly suggests pyelonephritis, a direct infection of the kidney. They may also be seen in inflammatory states, such as acute allergic interstitial nephritis, nephrotic syndrome, or post-streptococcal acute glomerulonephritis. White cells sometimes can be difficult to discern from epithelial cells and may require special staining. Differentiation from simple clumps of white cells can be made by the presence of hyaline matrix.

=== Bacterial casts ===
Given their appearance in pyelonephritis, these should be seen in association with loose bacteria, white blood cells, and white blood cell casts. Their discovery is likely rare, due to the infection-fighting efficiency of neutrophils and the possibility of misidentification as a fine granular cast.

=== Epithelial cell casts ===
This cast type is formed by inclusion or adhesion of desquamated epithelial cells of the tubule lining. Cells can adhere in random order or in sheets and are distinguished by large, round nuclei and a lower amount of cytoplasm. These can be seen in acute tubular necrosis and toxic ingestion, such as from mercury, diethylene glycol, or salicylate. In each case, clumps or sheets of cells may slough off simultaneously, depending on the focality of injury. Cytomegalovirus and viral hepatitis are organisms that can cause epithelial cell death, as well.

=== Eosinophilic cast ===
This type of cast contains eosinophils. It is seen in tubulo interstitial nephritis and occurs in allergy, commonly to drugs such as methicillin and NSAIDs.
