= Proteinase 3 =

Mammalian protein found in Homo sapiens

PRTN3
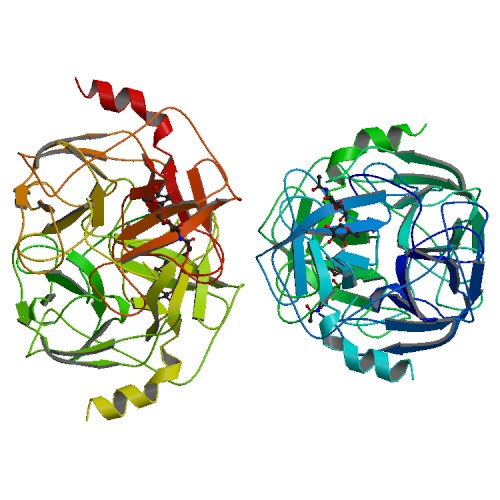

Identifiers
- Aliases: PRTN3, ACPA, AGP7, C-ANCA, CANCA, MBN, MBT, NP-4, NP4, P29, PR-3, PR3, proteinase 3
- External IDs: OMIM: 177020; MGI: 893580; GeneCards: PRTN3
Available structures
PDB	Ortholog search: PDBe RCSB
PDB	List of PDB id codes 1FUJ
Enzyme activity
EC #	BRENDA	ExPASy	KEGG	MetaCyc
3.4.21.76	↗	↗	↗	↗

Gene location (Human)
Chr.	Chromosome 19 (human)
Band	19p13.3	Start	840,999 bp
Band	19p13.3	End	848,175 bp

Gene location (Mouse)
Chr.	Chromosome 10 (mouse)
Band	10 C1|10 39.72 cM	Start	79,710,310 bp
Band	10 C1|10 39.72 cM	End	79,719,008 bp
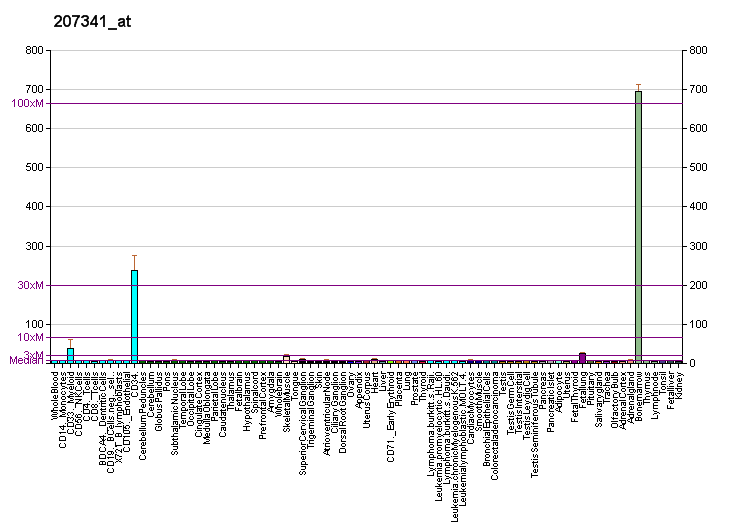
RNA expression pattern
Bgee	Human / Mouse (ortholog); Top expressed in: bone marrow; bone marrow cell; spleen; blood; monocyte; granulocyte; right lung; superior frontal gyrus; right frontal lobe; dorsolateral prefrontal cortex / Top expressed in: tibiofemoral joint; granulocyte; fetal liver hematopoietic progenitor cell; body of femur; bone marrow; ankle joint; blastocyst; embryo; human fetus; embryo; More reference expression data
BioGPS	More reference expression data
Gene ontology
Molecular function	enzyme binding; peptidase activity; serine-type peptidase activity; hydrolase activity; protein binding; serine-type endopeptidase activity; signaling receptor binding
Cellular component	extracellular matrix; plasma membrane; extracellular exosome; cytosol; extracellular region; extracellular space; azurophil granule lumen; plasma membrane raft; membrane; membrane raft; collagen-containing extracellular matrix
Biological process	collagen catabolic process; blood coagulation; negative regulation of phagocytosis; mature conventional dendritic cell differentiation; positive regulation of cell population proliferation; antimicrobial humoral response; neutrophil degranulation; proteolysis; membrane protein ectodomain proteolysis; positive regulation of GTPase activity; cell-cell junction maintenance; neutrophil extravasation; phagocytosis; cytokine-mediated signaling pathway
Sources:Amigo / QuickGO
Orthologs
Databases	NCBI: entry; OMA: entry
Species	Human	Mouse
Entrez	5657	19152
Ensembl	ENSG00000277804; ENSG00000196415	ENSMUSG00000057729
UniProt	P24158	Q61096
RefSeq (mRNA)	NM_002777	NM_011178
RefSeq (protein)	NP_002768	NP_035308
Location (UCSC)	Chr 19: 0.84 – 0.85 Mb	Chr 10: 79.71 – 79.72 Mb
PubMed search
- Wikidata
View/Edit Human	View/Edit Mouse

Proteinase 3, also known as PRTN3, is an enzyme that in humans is encoded by the PRTN3 gene.

== Function ==
PRTN3 is a serine protease enzyme expressed mainly in neutrophil granulocytes. Its exact role in the function of the neutrophil is unknown, but, in human neutrophils, proteinase 3 contributes to the proteolytic generation of antimicrobial peptides. It is also the target of anti-neutrophil cytoplasmic antibodies (ANCAs) of the c-ANCA (cytoplasmic subtype) class, a type of antibody frequently found in the disease granulomatosis with polyangiitis.
