= Anti-glomerular basement membrane antibody =

Autoantibodies called anti-glomerular basement membrane antibodies (anti-GBM antibodies), are the direct cause of anti-glomerular basement membrane (anti-GBM) disease. This is a rare autoimmune disorder that mainly impacts the kidneys, but may also affect the lungs. Instead of targeting external invaders such as pathogens or infections, these autoantibodies instead target the proteins in one's own basement membranes. Basement membranes are thin layers of proteins under the cells in the kidneys and lungs. When the membranes are attacked, they can be damaged.

== Normal function and structure of the kidneys and the lungs ==
The kidneys' job is to remove waste from our bodies and also acids that cell may make in order to keep our body's minerals and fluids balanced in our blood. If they are not their can be issues with muscles, nerves, tissues, controlling blood sugar, making blood cells, bone health, etc. In order for our Kidneys to function they need to filter out waste and in order to do so they have filter unit called nephrons that have a filter called the glomerulus that filters blood first and then the tubule that returns any important material to the bloodstream while removing waste.

When blood flows into the kidneys and into the nephron the blood goes through the glomerulus, which are tiny blood vessels that are group together. They have thing walls so that smaller particles, waste, and mostly water can flow through into the tubule. Whatever is filtered, the tubule reabsorbs whatever the body needs like for example water or minerals. Whatever it doesn't need like acids gets removes from the bloodstream and any leftover fluids and waste turn into urine. The glomerular basement membrane is the filtering barrier inside the glomerulus that decides what can stay and leave the bloodstream. Because proteins and molecules that are essential to the body cannot be flushed out since the body already spends energy producing them so wasting them would be like a waste of energy.[3] Lungs on the other hand have millions of little round balloon like structures call alveoli, and wrapped around them are blood tubes called capillaries that look likes veins or spider webs. When we inhale, oxygen goes from the alveoli into blood and when we exhale, carbon dioxide goes from the blood into the alveoli and leaves the body. In between the balloon like structure and the blood tubule is a thin protein layer called the basement membrane and this wall separates the air on one side and the blood on the other.

== Antigen Breakdown ==
Normally, our immune system protects us from harmful organisms like bacteria or viruses and develops certain characteristics that make the body consider these organisms as an antigen. When something is considered an antigen, which is viewed as something foreign or unwanted in the body, that triggers the immune system to start creating antibodies that fit and attach to it. Once it is attached, other parts of the immune system help remove the foreign molecule. In anti-GBM disease, the immune system makes an error because it loses tolerance for one of the body's own proteins and starts treating the protein as if it were foreign. That is why these antibodies are known as autoantibodies, because there are antibodies that attack the body's own cells and tissues.

The protein being attacked is called ɑ3(IV) NC1, and it’s one part of the types IV collagen that supports the framework of basement membranes in the kidneys. The collagen is part of the filtering barrier, and in the lungs is what separates the alveoli and the capillaries are around them.

The ɑ3(IV) NC1 protein has two sections of the protein called the EA and the EB epitopes, and are a specific area where an antibody can attach. Typically, multiple collagen proteins fit together in condensed structures because the way they are connected or folded the EA and EB areas are usually embedded in the structures and not exposed. So, the protein is there, but antibody binding areas are harder to be in contact with the antibodies. The collagen doesn't have to be damaged for those areas to become exposed; instead, they partly separate, unfold, or change the way its arrange that changes them from being covered to now being accessible to being reached by antibodies. Structural changes can happen in the normal collagen, but the way it starts for every patient is different and sometimes doesn’t have an explanation.

However, things like smoking, respiratory infections, exposure to hydrocarbons, or injured tissues may help with the irritation of the lungs or damage surrounding barriers. In the case of the lungs, if they are injured, it can make the capillary walls more permeable and allow antibodies to pass through more easily, allowing them to reach the alveolar basement membrane easily. In addition, exposing the protein doesn't guarantee why it is being attacked. To do so, a person’s immune system has to incorrectly decide that the exposed area is unknown to the body. In a person who is genetically predisposed, their immune cells may lose their normal tolerance for the α3 (IV) NC1 protein. Then the B cells make the anti-GBM antibodies that are shaped to attach to the exposed EA and EB areas because they would see it is something that shouldn’t be in our body.

== The antibodies affect on the lungs and kidneys ==
Once those antibodies attach to the basement membrane, they in a way, have a target on them that tells the immune system there is something wrong and needs to be attacked. Once they send that message, it causes complement proteins to become triggered and those are proteins that usually help fight infections. In this disease, they are becoming triggered around the membrane and not fight off an infection since there wasn’t one to begin with. Those proteins attract inflammatory cells. For example, neutrophils they are known for killing bacteria by secreting strong chemicals and enzymes. The issue is that there are no bacteria on that membrane, and those chemicals and enzymes start damaging the body’s tissues. So in the kidneys, the basement membrane is part of the filter in the glomerulus, and when that inflammation damages the filter, it becomes leaky. When it becomes leaky, blood cells and proteins that are supposed to stay in the bloodstream can now be passed into urine. Losing large amounts of blood and protein can be harmful and cause swelling, but the main issue is that the glomerulus can’t filter properly anymore. If the damage continues, small breaks can be made in the membrane, and inflammatory cells and material then collect in the space around the glomerulus. That collection creates a crescent shape and presses up against the glomerulus and affects the filtration process even more. If the glomeruli are damaged and the kidneys cannot remove harmful substances from building up in the body their function deteriorates and can cause kidney failure. Furthermore, in the lungs, the basement membrane that is between the alveoli and capillaries usually lets oxygen and carbon dioxide through, and capillaries keep blood inside. When inflammation damages the barrier, blood can leak from the capillaries into the alveoli, causing the air space to fill with blood, leaving less room for air and oxygen exchange. This is called pulmonary hemorrhage or alveolar hemorrhage it can cause coughing up blood, difficulty breathing, low oxygen levels, and if there is severe bleeding.

== How doctors diagnose ==
Doctors test the urine and look to see if there is any blood or proteins so that they know that the glomerular filter is damaged, causing the filter to be leaky. They will also look at those blood cells and look to see if they are squished or misshapen from being squeezed through an injured glomerulus, and groups of red blood cells may form molds called red blood casts inside the kidney tubules. Doctors also measure creatinine in the blood, and that is waste that healthy kidneys normally remove. When the filters don't work, the creatinine level accumulates, and if the filtering is really bad, the high levels of creatinine should give doctors a better idea of how badly the kidneys are failing. Looking for damage from the lung perspective, a doctor usually will ask if the person is coughing blood, feeling shortness of breath, or chest discomfort. Unfortunately, someone can have bleeding in their lungs without visibly coughing up blood, so the doctors would have to check for a person's oxygen levels because blood inside the alveoli can affect the oxygen moving through the bloodstream. A complete blood count measures hemoglobin and can reveal anemia if enough blood has been lost into the lungs. Also, a chest x-rays or CT scan can show cloudy areas where blood has been stored in the alveoli, showing that perhaps there is a pulmonary hemorrhage, but those don’t prove that the anti-GBM antibodies cause it. Looking for the actual cause, doctors test the antibody directly by getting a blood test and using ELISA, and the laboratory uses the ɑ3(IV) NC1 protein that anti-GBM antibodies attack. They mix the patient’s blood with that protein. If anti-GBM antibodies are in the blood, they attach to it, and the test makes a signal showing that they were detected. That was a positive result, but if there is a negative result doesn’t mean there aren’t antibodies; it just means the amount of antibodies may be too low to detect. Doctors also try to perform a kidney biopsy by removing a small piece of kidney tissue so they can look at the glomeruli head-on and check to see if they are crescent-shaped. The more crescent shaped glomeruli there are, the easier it is to determine how serious the kidney injury may be.

== Treatment ==
Plasma exchange, also called plasmapheresis, removes the antibodies that are already in the bloodstream by leaving the body through a tube and goes through a machine that separates the blood from the blood cells from the plasma. Plasma is the liquid part of the blood that has the antibodies. The plasma with the anti-GBM antibodies is then removed, and blood cells are put back with a replacement fluid, and the process is repeated every day until the antibodies are no longer detectable or available to attack basement membranes. Just in case the immune system makes a new antibody, doctors give cyclophosphamide, and it suppresses immune cells. Especially the immune cells that make antibodies, so the plasma exchange gets rid of them, and the cyclophosphamide slows the production of antibodies. Steroids like glucocorticoids can also be used to calm down inflammation caused by the antibodies that attach to the basement membranes. They decrease the activity of complement proteins and inflammatory immune cells, helping reduce further injury.

== See also ==
- Glomerular basement membrane
