= Granulomatosis with polyangiitis =

Autoimmune disease with chronic blood vessel inflammation

- Other names: Formerly known as Wegener's granulomatosis
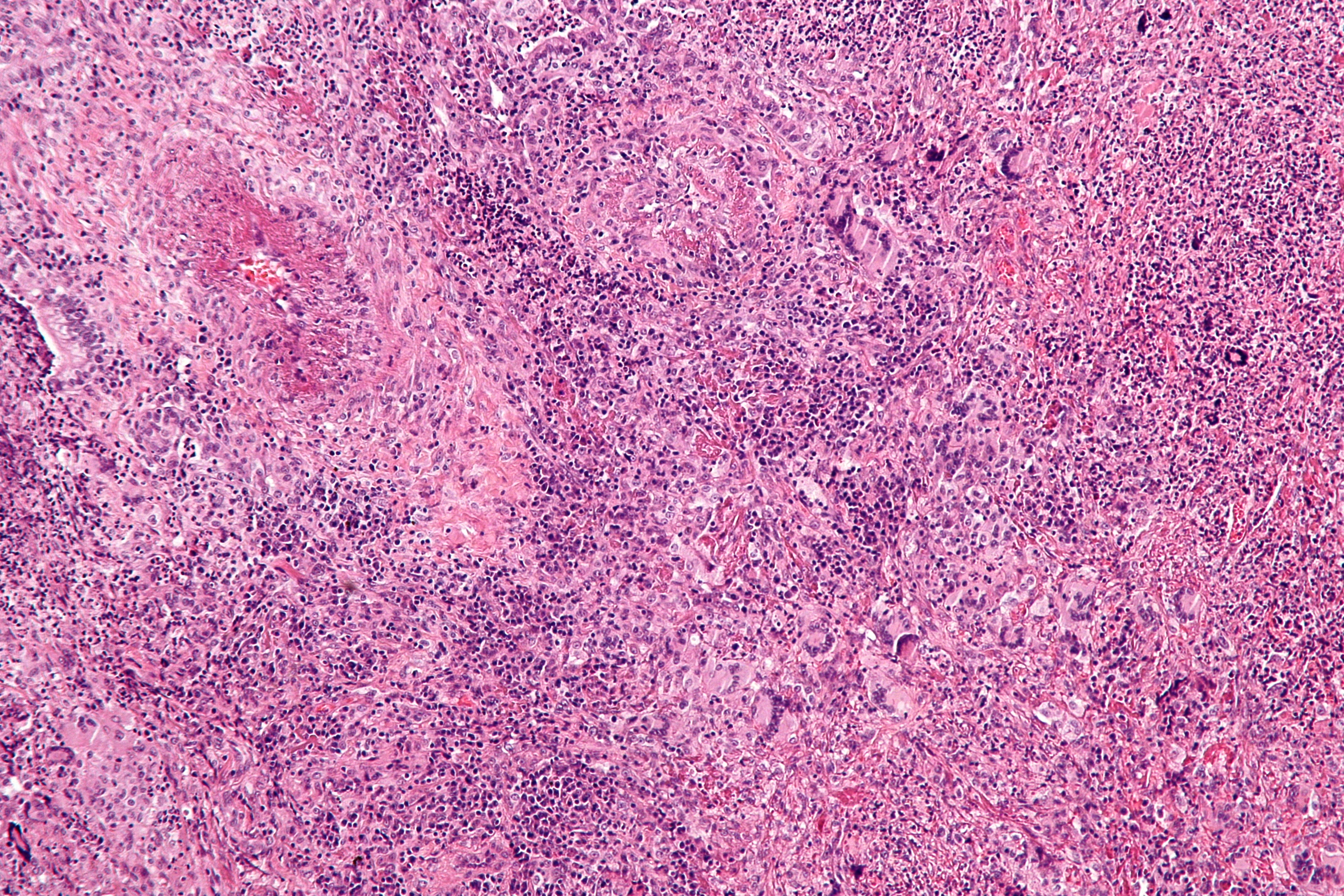
- Micrograph showing features characteristic of granulomatosis with polyangiitis – a vasculitis and granulomas with multi-nucleated giant cells. H&E stain.
- Specialty: Immunology, internal medicine
- Causes: Autoimmune disease
- Frequency: 0.005%

Granulomatosis with polyangiitis (GPA) is a rare, long-term, systemic disorder that involves the formation of granulomas and inflammation of blood vessels (vasculitis). It is an autoimmune disease and a form of vasculitis that affects small- and medium-sized vessels in many organs, but most commonly affects the upper respiratory tract, lungs, and kidneys. The signs and symptoms of GPA are highly varied and reflect which organs are supplied by the affected blood vessels. Typical signs and symptoms include nosebleeds, stuffy nose and crustiness of nasal secretions, and inflammation of the uveal layer of the eye. Damage to the heart, lungs, and kidneys can be fatal. The disease was formerly known as Wegener's granulomatosis (WG).

The cause of GPA is unknown. Genetics has a role in GPA, though the risk of inheritance appears to be low.

GPA treatment depends on the severity of the disease. Severe disease is typically treated with a combination of immunosuppressive medications such as rituximab or cyclophosphamide and high-dose corticosteroids to control the symptoms of the disease, and azathioprine, methotrexate, or rituximab to keep the disease under control. Plasma exchange is also used in severe cases with damage to the lungs, kidneys, or intestines.

The number of new cases of GPA each year is estimated at 2.1 to 14.4 new cases per million people in Europe. GPA is rare in Japanese and African-American populations, occurring more often in people of Northern European descent. GPA is estimated to affect three cases per 100,000 people in the United States and affects men and women equally. GPA has infrequently been reported in minors.

== Signs and symptoms ==
Saddle nose damage due to granulomatosis with polyangiitis is typical.

Initial signs are highly variable, and diagnosis can be severely delayed due to the nonspecific nature of the symptoms. In general, irritation and nasal inflammation are the first signs in most people. Involvement of the upper respiratory tract, such as the nose and sinuses, is seen in nearly all people with GPA. Typical signs and symptoms of nose or sinus involvement include crusting around the nose, stuffiness, nosebleeds, runny nose, and "saddle-nose" deformity due to a hole in the septum of the nose. Inflammation of the outer layers of the eye (scleritis and episcleritis) and conjunctivitis are the most common signs of GPA in the eye; involvement of the eyes is common and occurs in slightly more than half of people with the disease.

- Kidney: Rapidly progressive glomerulonephritis (75%), leading to chronic kidney disease
- Upper airway, eye, and ear disease:
  - Ears: conductive hearing loss due to auditory tube dysfunction, sensorineural hearing loss (unclear mechanism)
  - Oral cavity: strawberry gingivitis, underlying bone destruction with loosening of teeth, and nonspecific ulcerations throughout the lining of the mouth
- Trachea: Subglottal stenosis
- Lungs: Pulmonary nodules (referred to as "coin lesions"), infiltrates (often interpreted as pneumonia), cavitary lesions, bleeding in the lungs causing a person to cough up blood, and rarely bronchial stenosis
- Arthritis: Pain or swelling (60%), often initially diagnosed as rheumatoid arthritis
- Skin: Subcutaneous nodules (granulomas) on the elbow, purpura, and various others (see cutaneous vasculitis)
- Nervous system: Occasionally sensory neuropathy (10%) and rarely mononeuritis multiplex
- Heart, gastrointestinal tract, brain, other organs: Rarely affected

== Causes ==
The cause of GPA is unknown, although microbes, such as bacteria and viruses, as well as genetics, have been implicated in its pathogenesis.

== Pathophysiology ==
Classic microscopic features of GPA include inflammation of blood vessels featuring poorly formed granulomas, necrosis, and many giant cells. Bacterial colonization with Staphylococcus aureus has been hypothesized as an initiating factor of the autoimmunity seen in people with GPA. Several genes involved in the immune system including PTPN22, CTLA4, and human leukocyte antigen genes may influence the risk of developing GPA.

Antineutrophil cytoplasmic antibodies (ANCAs) are now widely presumed to be responsible for the inflammation in GPA. The typical ANCAs in GPA are those that react with proteinase 3, an enzyme prevalent in neutrophil granulocytes. In vitro studies have found that ANCAs can activate neutrophils, increase their adherence to endothelium, and induce their degranulation that can damage endothelial cells. This phenomenon could cause extensive damage to the vessel wall, especially to arterioles.

== Diagnosis ==
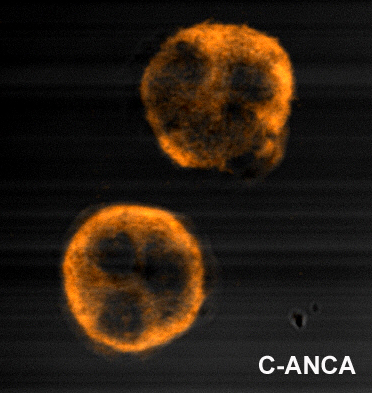
Immunofluorescence pattern produced by binding of ANCAs to ethanol-fixed neutrophils, from a person with GPA

Granulomatosis with polyangiitis is usually suspected only when a person has had unexplained symptoms for a long period. The determination of ANCAs can aid in diagnosing GPA, but a positive ANCA test is not conclusive, and a negative ANCA test result is insufficient to exclude the diagnosis. More than 90% of people who have GPA test positive for ANCAs. Cytoplasmic-staining ANCAs that react with the enzyme proteinase 3 (cANCA) in neutrophils (a type of white blood cells) are associated with GPA. Involvement of the ears, nose, and throat is more common in granulomatosis with polyangiitis than in the similar condition microscopic polyangiitis.

If the person has signs of kidney involvement or cutaneous vasculitis, a biopsy is obtained from the kidneys. Rarely, a thoracoscopic lung biopsy is required. On histopathological examination, a biopsy will show leukocytoclastic vasculitis with necrotic changes and granulomatous inflammation (clumps of typically arranged white blood cells) on microscopy. These granulomas are the main reason for the name granulomatosis with polyangiitis, although they are not an essential feature. Nevertheless, necrotizing granulomas are a hallmark of this disease. Many biopsies can be nonspecific, though, and 50% provide too little information for the diagnosis of GPA.

=== Classification ===
Granulomatosis with polyangiitis is part of a larger group of vasculitic syndromes called systemic vasculitides or necrotizing vasculopathies, all of which feature an autoimmune attack by an abnormal type of circulating antibody termed ANCAs (antineutrophil cytoplasmic antibodies) against small and medium-sized blood vessels. Apart from GPA, this category includes eosinophilic granulomatosis with polyangiitis (EGPA) and microscopic polyangiitis. Although GPA affects small- and medium-sized vessels, it is formally classified as one of the small-vessel vasculitides in the Chapel Hill system.

=== Criteria ===
In 1990, the American College of Rheumatology accepted classification criteria for GPA. These criteria were not intended for diagnosis but for inclusion in randomized controlled trials. Two or more positive criteria have a sensitivity of 88.2% and a specificity of 92.0% of describing GPA.

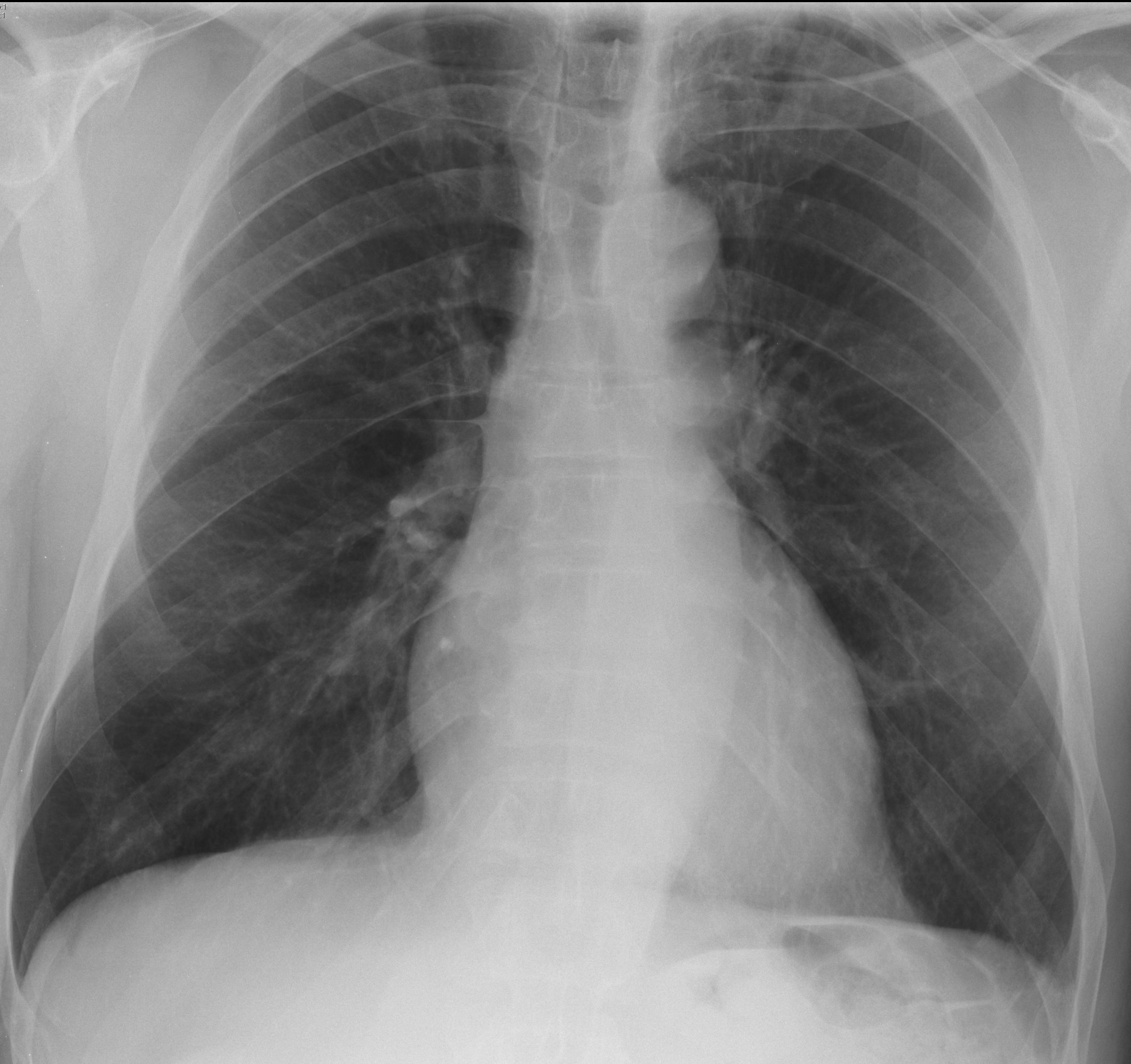
The left apical region is opacified in a case of granulomatosis with polyangiitis.

- Nasal or oral inflammation with painful or painless oral ulcers or purulent or bloody nasal discharge
- Lungs: Abnormal chest X-ray with nodules, infiltrates, or cavities
- Kidneys: Urinary sediment with microscopic hematuria or red cell casts
- Biopsy: Granulomatous inflammation within the arterial wall or in the perivascular area

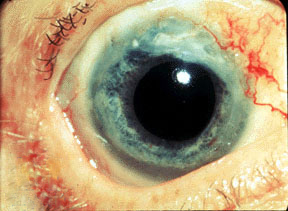
Sclerokeratitis associated with GPA

According to the Chapel Hill Consensus Conference (CHCC) on the nomenclature of systemic vasculitis (1992), establishing the diagnosis of GPA demands a granulomatous inflammation involving the respiratory tract, and a vasculitis of small to medium-sized vessels.

Several investigators have compared the ACR and Chapel Hill criteria.

In 2022, the American College of Rheumatology and the European Alliance of Associations for Rheumatology updated the classification criteria for GPA.

== Treatment ==
GPA treatment depends on its severity and whether it has caused organ damage.

=== Severe disease ===
The standard treatment for severe GPA is to induce remission with immunosuppressants such as rituximab or cyclophosphamide in combination with high-dose corticosteroids. Plasmapheresis is sometimes recommended for very severe manifestations of GPA, such as diffuse alveolar hemorrhage and rapidly progressive glomerulonephritis (as seen in pulmonary-renal syndrome). The use of plasmapheresis in those with GPA and acute kidney failure (renal vasculitis) might reduce progression to end-stage kidney disease at three months.

Oral and intravenous cyclophosphamide are both effective for inducing GPA remission. Oral cyclophosphamide at a dose of 2 mg/kg/day was the standard treatment for many years; this regimen resulted in complete remission in more than 75% of people with GPA but is associated with significant toxicities, including infertility, inflammation and bleeding from the bladder, and bladder cancer. In contrast, administering pulsed doses of intravenous cyclophosphamide is equally effective for inducing remission, results in a lower cumulative dose, and decreases the incidence of abnormally low white blood cell counts by one-third. However, pulsed intravenous cyclophosphamide may be associated with a higher risk of GPA relapse when compared to oral cyclophosphamide. Due to a high frequency of abnormally low white blood cell counts seen with cyclophosphamide treatment, Pneumocystis jirovecii pneumonia is a common complication, so prophylaxis against this pathogen is recommended.

Rituximab may be substituted for cyclophosphamide to induce remission since it is similarly effective and has a comparable side-effect profile. The dose of corticosteroids is generally tapered (decreased) very slowly over several months to reduce the risk of another GPA flare. After a person with GPA has successfully undergone induction and disease remission, the treatment goal then shifts to maintaining remission and preventing subsequent GPA flares. Less-toxic immunosuppressing medications such as rituximab, methotrexate, azathioprine, leflunomide, or mycophenolate mofetil are used. TNF inhibitors, such as etanercept, appear to be ineffective and are not recommended for routine use.

=== Limited disease ===
In generalized non-organ-threatening disease, remission can be achieved with a combination of methotrexate and corticosteroids, where the steroid dose is reduced after remission; methotrexate is then used as maintenance therapy. Treatment measures for localised GPA of the nose and sinuses include nasal irrigation, nasal corticosteroids, and antibiotics if infection occurs. If perforation of the nasal septum occurs (or saddle-nose deformity), then surgical repair is recommended.

Trimethoprim/sulfamethoxazole has been proposed to help prevent relapse, though a 2015 Cochrane review did not confirm fewer relapses with trimethoprim/sulfamethoxazole treatment.

== Prognosis ==
Before modern treatments, the two-year survival was under 10%. The average survival was five months. Death usually resulted from uremia or respiratory failure. The revised five-factor score is associated with five-year mortality from GPA and is based on these criteria: Age greater than 65 years, cardiac symptoms, gastrointestinal involvement, chronic kidney disease, and the absence of ear, nose, and throat symptoms.

With corticosteroids and cyclophosphamide, five-year survival is over 80%. Long-term complications are common (86%), mainly chronic kidney failure, hearing loss, and deafness. The risk of relapse is increased in people with GPA who test positive for anti-PR3 ANCA antibodies and is higher than the relapse risk for microscopic polyangiitis.

Today, medication toxicity is managed more carefully, and long-term remissions are possible. Some affected people can lead relatively normal lives and remain in remission for 20+ years after treatment.

== Epidemiology ==
The incidence of GPA is 0.5 to 20 cases per million per year. It is exceedingly rare in Japan and among African Americans.

== History ==
Scottish otolaryngologist Peter McBride (1854–1946) first described the condition in 1897 in a British Medical Journal article entitled "Photographs of a case of rapid destruction of the nose and face". Heinz Karl Ernst Klinger (born 1907) added information on the anatomical pathology. An early name for the disease was pathergic granulomatosis. The disease is still sometimes confused with lethal midline granuloma and lymphomatoid granulomatosis, both malignant lymphomas.

The full clinical picture was first presented by Friedrich Wegener (1907–1990), a German pathologist, in two reports in 1936 and 1939, leading to the eponymous name Wegener's granulomatosis or Wegener granulomatosis (English: /ˈvɛɡənər/). In 2011, the American College of Rheumatology, the American Society of Nephrology, and the European League Against Rheumatism resolved to change the name to granulomatosis with polyangiitis, given Wegener's association with the Nazi Party.

== See also ==
- List of medical eponyms with Nazi associations
