= Oliguria =

Medical condition of low urine output

- Other names: Hypouresis
- Specialty: Nephrology

Oliguria or hypouresis is the low output of urine: specifically, more than 80 ml/day, but less than 400ml/day. The decreased output of urine may be a sign of dehydration, kidney failure, hypovolemic shock, hyperosmolar hyperglycemic nonketotic syndrome (HHNS), multiple organ dysfunction syndrome, urinary obstruction/urinary retention, diabetic ketoacidosis (DKA), pre-eclampsia, and urinary tract infections, among other conditions.

Beyond oliguria is anuria, which represents an absence of urine, clinically classified as below 80 or 100 ml/day.

The term oliguria is derived from oligo-meaning "small, little" + -uria, from the Greek word ouron, meaning "urine".

== Definition ==
Oliguria is defined as a urine output that is less than 1 mL/kg/h in infants, less than 0.5 mL/kg/h in children, and less than 400 mL or 500 mL per 24h in adults - this equals 17 or 21 mL/hour. For example, in an adult weighing 70 kg it equals 0.24 or 0.3 mL/kg/h. Alternatively, however, the value of 0.5 mL/kg/h is commonly used to define oliguria in adults as well.

== Diagnostic approach ==
Perform ultrasound examination of the kidney to rule out obstructive processes.

The mechanisms causing oliguria can be categorized globally in three different categories:

1. Prerenal: in response to hypoperfusion of the kidney (e.g. as a result of dehydration by poor oral intake, cardiogenic shock, diarrhoea, G6PD deficiency, massive bleeding or sepsis)
2. Renal: due to kidney damage (severe hypoperfusion, rhabdomyolysis, medication)
3. Postrenal: as a consequence of obstruction of the urine flow (e.g. enlarged prostate, tumour compression urinary outflow, expanding hematoma or fluid collection)

=== Postoperative oliguria ===
Patients usually have a decrease in urine output after a major operation that may be a normal physiological response to:

- fluid/ blood loss – decreased glomerular filtration rate secondary to hypovolemia and/or hypotension
- response of adrenal cortex to stress-increase in aldosterone (Na and water retention) and antidiuretic hormone (ADH) release

== Babies ==
Oliguria, when defined as less than 1 mL/kg/h, in infants is not attributed to kidney failure.

== See also ==
- Abdominal compartment syndrome (ACS)
- Intra-abdominal hypertension (IAH)
- Polyuria (excessive urine production)
