= Anti-neutrophil cytoplasmic antibody =

Group of autoantibodies

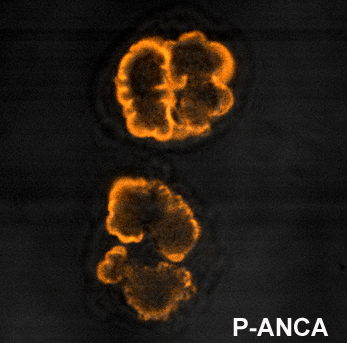
Perinuclear staining typical of p-ANCA

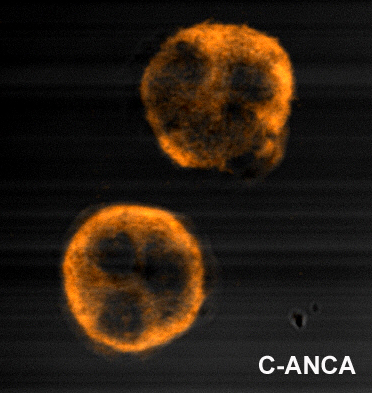
The granular, cytoplasmic staining pattern of c-ANCA

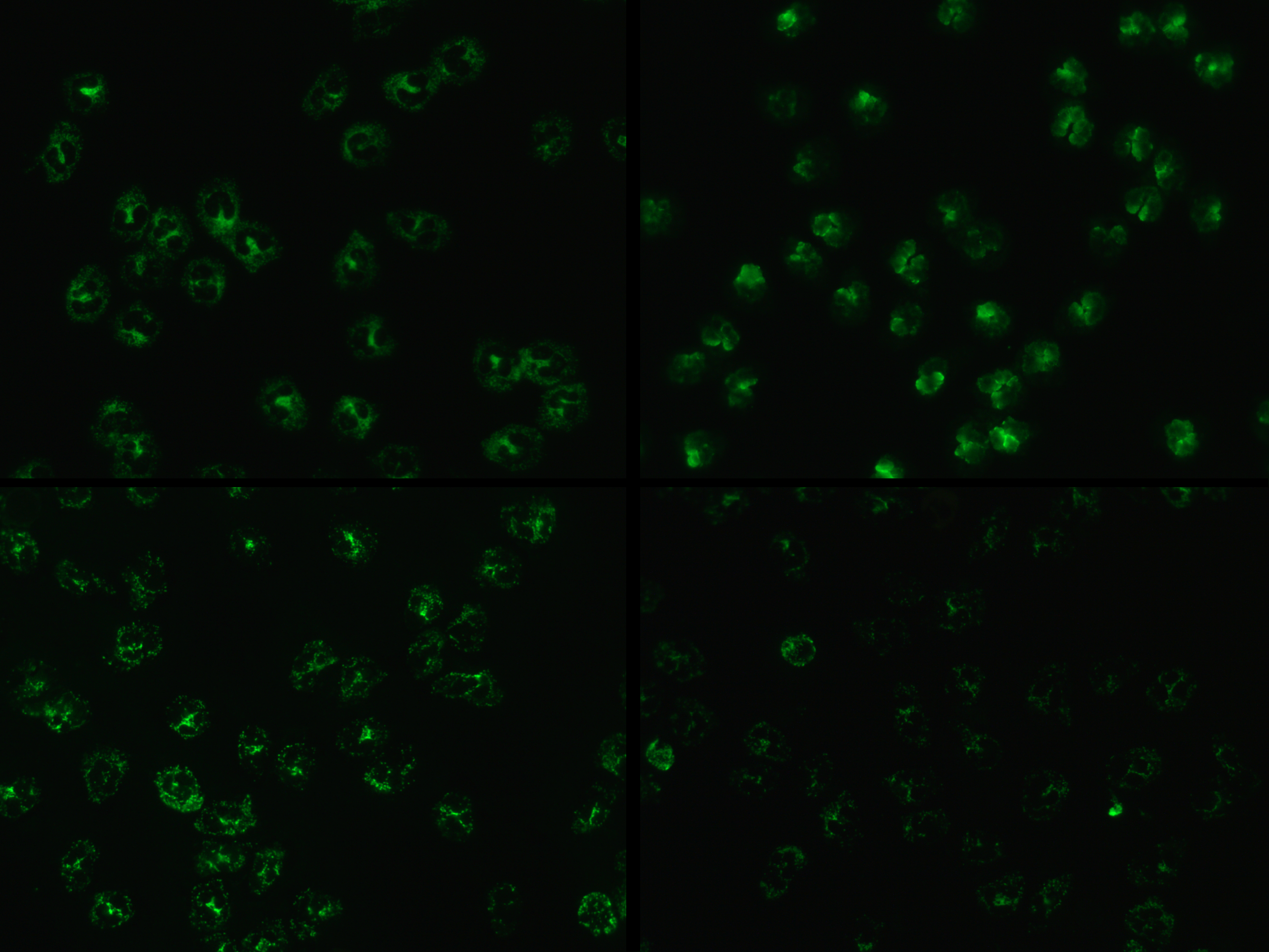
Immunofluorescence staining pattern of ANCA. Top left – PR3 antibodies on ethanol-fixed neutrophils (c-ANCA pattern). Bottom left – PR3 antibodies on formalin-fixed neutrophils(c-ANCA pattern). Top right – MPO antibodies on ethanol-fixed neutrophils (p-ANCA pattern). Bottom right – MPO antibodies on formalin-fixed neutrophils (c-ANCA pattern).(FITC conjugate)

Anti-neutrophil cytoplasmic antibodies (ANCAs) are a group of autoantibodies, mainly of the IgG type, against antigens in the cytoplasm of neutrophils (the most common type of white blood cell) and monocytes. They are detected as a blood test in a number of autoimmune disorders, but are particularly associated with systemic vasculitis, so called ANCA-associated vasculitides (AAV).

== ANCA IF patterns ==
Immunofluorescence (IF) on ethanol-fixed neutrophils is used to detect ANCA, although formalin-fixed neutrophils may be used to help differentiate ANCA patterns. ANCA can be divided into four patterns when visualised by IF: cytoplasmic ANCA (c-ANCA), C-ANCA (atypical), perinuclear ANCA (p-ANCA) and atypical ANCA (a-ANCA), also known as x-ANCA. c-ANCA shows cytoplasmic granular fluorescence with central interlobular accentuation. C-ANCA (atypical) shows cytoplasmic staining that is usually uniform and has no interlobular accentuation. p-ANCA has three subtypes: classical p-ANCA, p-ANCA without nuclear extension, and granulocyte-specific antinuclear antibody (GS-ANA). Classical p-ANCA shows perinuclear staining with nuclear extension; p-ANCA without nuclear extension shows perinuclear staining only; and GS-ANA shows nuclear staining on granulocytes only. a-ANCA often shows both cytoplasmic and perinuclear staining.

== ANCA antigens ==
The c-ANCA antigen is specifically proteinase 3 (PR3). p-ANCA antigens include myeloperoxidase (MPO) and bacterial permeability increasing factor Bactericidal/permeability-increasing protein (BPI). Other antigens exist for c-ANCA (atypical); however, many remain unknown. Classical p-ANCA occurs with antibodies directed against MPO. p-ANCA without nuclear extension occurs with antibodies to BPI, cathepsin G, elastase, lactoferrin and lysozyme. GS-ANA are antibodies directed to granulocyte-specific nuclear antigens. Atypical ANCA are thought to be antigens similar to those of p-ANCAs; however, they may arise from differences in neutrophil processing.

Other less common antigens include HMG1 (p-ANCA pattern), HMG2 (p-ANCA pattern), alpha enolase (p and c-ANCA pattern), catalase (p and c-ANCA pattern), beta glucuronidase (p-ANCA pattern), azurocidin (p and c-ANCA pattern), actin (p and a-ANCA) and h-lamp-2 (c-ANCA).

== ELISA ==
Enzyme-linked immunosorbent assay (ELISA) is used in diagnostic laboratories to detect ANCAs. Although IF can be used to screen for many ANCAs, ELISA is used to detect antibodies to individual antigens. The most common antigens used on an ELISA microtitre plate are MPO and PR3, which are usually tested for after a positive IF test.

== Development ==
It is poorly understood how ANCA are developed, although several hypotheses have been suggested. There is probably a genetic contribution, particularly genes that control the level of immune response. Genetic susceptibility is likely linked to an environmental factor, for example, exposure to silicates. Two possible mechanisms of ANCA development have been postulated. Neither of these theories answers the question of how the different ANCA specificities are developed, and much research is still examining the nature of ANCA development.

=== Theory of molecular mimicry ===
Microbial superantigens are molecules expressed by bacteria and other microorganisms that can stimulate a strong immune response by activation of T-cells. These molecules generally have regions that resemble self-antigens that promote a residual autoimmune response – this is the theory of molecular mimicry. Staphylococcal and streptococcal superantigens have been characterized in autoimmune diseases – the classical example in post group A streptococcal rheumatic heart disease, where there is similarity between M proteins of Streptococcus pyogenes to cardiac myosin and laminin. It has also been shown that up to 70% of patients with granulomatosis with polyangiitis are chronic nasal carriers of Staphylococcus aureus, with carriers having an eight times increased risk of relapse. This would therefore be considered a type II hypersensitivity reaction.

=== Theory of defective apoptosis ===
Neutrophil apoptosis, or programmed cell death, is vital for controlling the duration of the early inflammatory response, thus restricting neutrophil-induced tissue damage. ANCA may develop due to ineffective apoptosis or ineffective removal of apoptotic cell fragments, leading to exposure of the immune system to molecules normally sequestered within cells. This theory solves the paradox of how antibodies could be raised against the intracellular antigenic targets of ANCA.

== Role in disease ==
=== Disease associations ===
ANCAs are associated with small vessel vasculitides including granulomatosis with polyangiitis, microscopic polyangiitis, primary pauci-immune necrotizing crescentic glomerulonephritis (a type of renal-limited microscopic polyangiitis), eosinophilic granulomatosis with polyangiitis and drug induced vasculitides. ANCA-associated vasculitides (AAV) have new classification criteria, updated in 2022. PR3-directed c-ANCA is present in 80-90% of granulomatosis with polyangiitis, 20-40% of microscopic polyangiitis, 20-40% of pauci-immune crescentic glomerulonephritis, and 35% of eosinophilic granulomatosis with polyangiitis. c-ANCA (atypical) is present in 80% of cystic fibrosis (with BPI as the target antigen) and also in inflammatory bowel disease, primary sclerosing cholangitis and rheumatoid arthritis (with antibodies to multiple antigenic targets). p-ANCA with MPO specificity is found in 50% of microscopic polyangiitis, 50% of primary pauci-immune necrotizing crescentic glomerulonephritis and 35% of eosinophilic granulomatosis with polyangiitis. p-ANCA with specificity to other antigens are associated with inflammatory bowel disease, rheumatoid arthritis, drug-induced vasculitis, autoimmune liver disease, drug-induced syndromes and parasitic infections. Atypical ANCA is associated with drug-induced systemic vasculitis, inflammatory bowel disease and rheumatoid arthritis. The ANCA-positive rate is much higher in patients with type 1 diabetes mellitus than in healthy individuals.

Levamisole, which is a common adulterant of cocaine, can cause an ANCA positive vasculitis.

The presence or absence of ANCA cannot indicate the presence or absence of disease, and results are correlated with clinical features. The association of ANCA and disease activity remains controversial; however, the reappearance of ANCA after treatment can indicate a relapse.

=== Pathogenesis ===
Although the pathogenic role of ANCA remains controversial, in vitro and animal models support the idea that the antibodies have a direct pathological role in the development of small-vessel vasculitides. MPO and PR3-specific ANCA can activate neutrophils and monocytes through their Fc and Fab'2 receptors, which can be enhanced by cytokines, which cause neutrophils to display MPO and PR3 on their surface. Aberrant glycosylation of the MPO- and PR3-specific ANCA enhances their ability to interact with activating Fc receptors on neutrophils. The activated neutrophils can then adhere to endothelial cells where degranulation occurs. This releases free oxygen radicals and lytic enzymes, resulting in damage to the endothelium by inducing necrosis and apoptosis. Furthermore, neutrophils release chemoattractive signalling molecules that recruit additional neutrophils to the endothelium, leading to a positive feedback loop. Animal models have shown that MPO antibodies can induce necrotizing crescentic glomerulonephritis and systemic small vessel vasculitis. In these animal models, glomerulonephritis and vasculitis can occur in the absence of T-cells; however, neutrophils must be present. Although ANCA titres have been noted to have limited correlation with disease activity, except for kidney disease, and with risk of relapse, this is explained by differences in the epitopes and affinity of ANCAs. ANCAs induce excess activation of neutrophils, resulting in the production of neutrophil extracellular traps (NETs), which cause damage to small blood vessels. In addition, in patients with active disease, treated with Rituximab, an anti-CD20 antibody which removes circulating B-cells, clinical remission correlates more with the decreasing number of circulating B-cells than decrease in ANCA titre, which in some patients does not change during treatment. The same study found that clinical relapse in some patients was associated with the return of circulating B-cells. Based on the above observations and that ANCA reactive B-cells can be found in circulation in patients with AAV, an alternative hypothesis have been proposed assigning a direct pathogenic role of these cells, whereby activated neutrophils and ANCA-reactive B-cells engage in intercellular cross-talk, which leads not only to neutrophil degranulation and inflammation but also to the proliferation and differentiation of ANCA-reactive B-cells. However, this hypothesis remains to be tested.

=== Treatment ===
Avacopan was approved for medical use in the United States to treat anti-neutrophil cytoplasmic autoantibody-associated vasculitis in October 2021.

== History ==
ANCAs were originally described in Davies et al. in 1982 in segmental necrotising glomerulonephritis. The Second International ANCA Workshop, held in the Netherlands in May 1989, fixed the nomenclature on perinuclear vs. cytoplasmic patterns, and the antigens MPO and PR3 were discovered in 1988 and 1989, respectively. International ANCA Workshops have been carried out every two years.
