= Acute proliferative glomerulonephritis =

- Micrograph of a post-infectious glomerulonephritis. Kidney biopsy. PAS stain.
- Specialty: Nephrology
- Symptoms: Hypertension
- Causes: Caused by Streptococcus bacteria
- Diagnostic method: Kidney biopsy, Complement profile
- Treatment: Low-sodium diet, Blood pressure management
- Frequency: 1.5 million (2015)

Acute proliferative glomerulonephritis is a disorder of the small blood vessels of the kidney. It is a common complication of bacterial infections, typically skin infection by Streptococcus bacteria types 12, 4 and 1 (impetigo) but also after streptococcal pharyngitis, for which it is also known as postinfectious glomerulonephritis (PIGN) or poststreptococcal glomerulonephritis (PSGN). In adults, the signs and symptoms of infection may still be present at the time when the kidney problems develop, and the terms infection-related glomerulonephritis or bacterial infection-related glomerulonephritis are also used.

Acute glomerulonephritis resulted in 19,000 deaths in 2013, down from 24,000 deaths in 1990 worldwide. Acute proliferative glomerulonephritis can be a risk factor for future albuminuria.

== Signs and symptoms ==
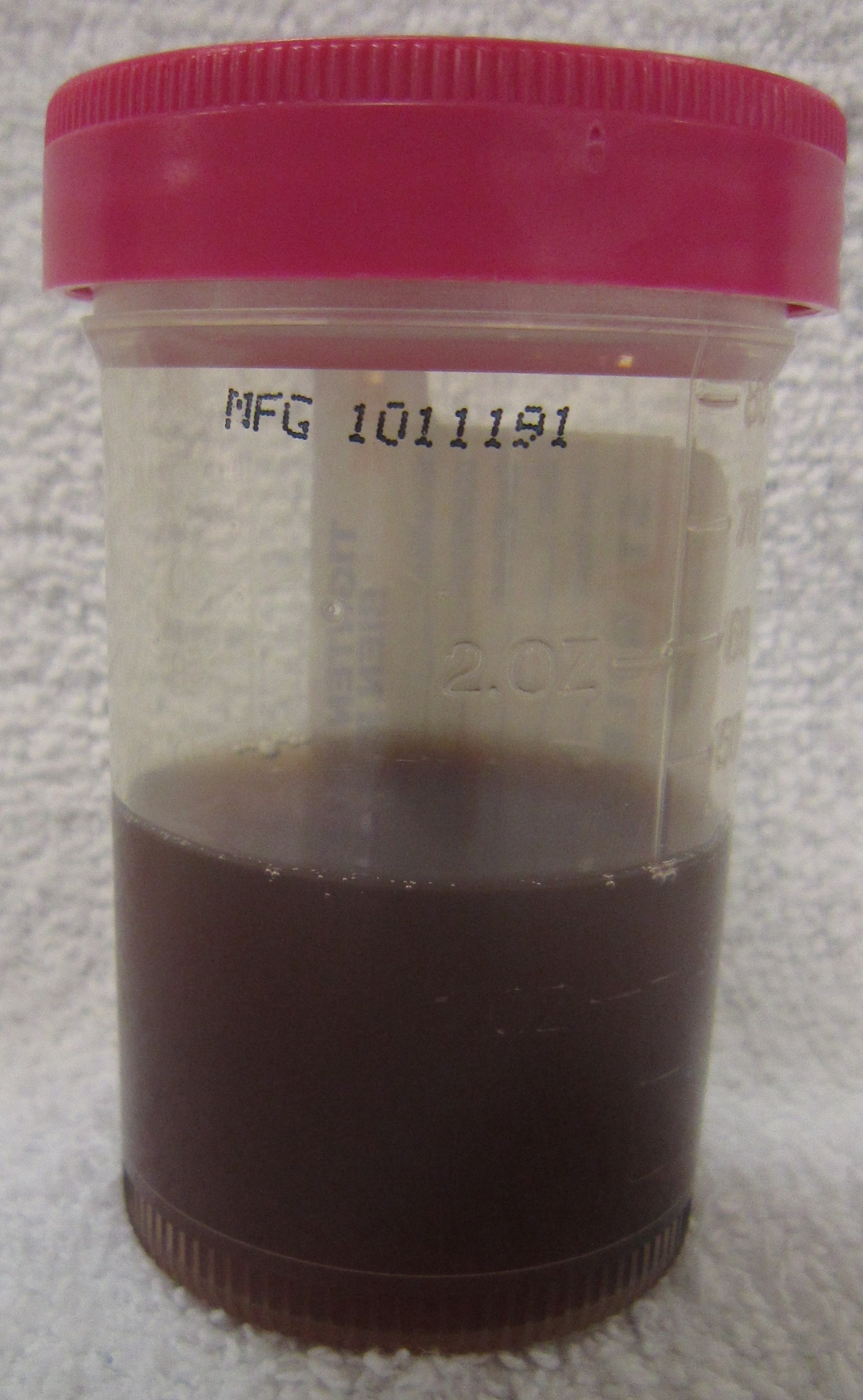
Hematuria

Among the signs and symptoms of acute proliferative glomerulonephritis are the following:

- Hematuria
- Oliguria
- Edema
- Hypertension
- Fever (headache, malaise, anorexia, nausea.)

== Causes ==
Acute proliferative glomerulonephritis (post-streptococcal glomerulonephritis) is caused by an infection with streptococcus bacteria, usually three weeks after infection, usually of the pharynx or the skin, given the time required to raise antibodies and complement proteins. The infection causes blood vessels in the kidneys to develop inflammation, this hampers the renal organs ability to filter urine. Acute proliferative glomerulonephritis most commonly occurs in children.

== Pathophysiology ==
The pathophysiology of this disorder is consistent with an immune-complex-mediated mechanism, a type III hypersensitivity reaction. This disorder produces proteins that have different antigenic determinants, which in turn have an affinity for sites in the glomerulus. As soon as binding occurs to the glomerulus, via interaction with properdin, the complement is activated. Complement fixation causes the generation of additional inflammatory mediators.

Complement activation is very important in acute proliferative glomerulonephritis. Apparently immunoglobulin (Ig)-binding proteins bind C4BP. Complement regulatory proteins (FH and FHL-1), may be removed by SpeB, and therefore restrain FH and FHL-1 recruitment in the process of infection.

== Diagnosis ==
Acute Glomerulonephritis.

The following diagnostic methods can be used for acute proliferative glomerulonephritis:

- Kidney biopsy
- Complement profile
- Imaging studies
- Blood chemistry studies

Clinically, acute proliferative glomerulonephritis is diagnosed following a differential diagnosis between (and, ultimately, diagnosis of) staphylococcal and streptococcal impetigo. Serologically, diagnostic markers can be tested; specifically, the streptozyme test is used and measures multiple streptococcal antibodies: antistreptolysin, antihyaluronidase, antistreptokinase, antinicotinamide-adenine dinucleotidase, and anti-DNAse B antibodies.

=== Differential diagnosis ===
The differential diagnosis of acute proliferative glomerulonephritis is based on the following:

1. Causes of acute glomerulonephritis:
  - IgA nephropathy
  - Lupus nephritis
  - Type 1 membranoproliferative glomerulonephritis
  - Bacterial endocarditis
  - Shunt nephritis
  - Cryoglobulinemia
2. Nephrotic syndrome
3. Causes of generalized edema:
  - Malnutrition
  - Malabsorption
  - Renal affection
  - Liver cell failure
  - Right side heart failure
  - Angioedema

== Prevention ==
Antibiotic type

It is unclear whether or not acute proliferative glomerulonephritis (i.e., poststreptococcal glomerulonephritis) can be prevented with early prophylactic antibiotic therapy, with some authorities arguing that antibiotics can prevent development of acute proliferative glomerulonephritis.

== Treatment ==
Acute management of acute proliferative glomerulonephritis mainly consists of blood pressure (BP) control. A low-sodium diet may be instituted when hypertension is present. In individuals with oliguric acute kidney injury, the potassium level should be controlled. Thiazide or loop diuretics can be used to simultaneously reduce edema and control hypertension; however electrolytes such as potassium must be monitored. Beta-blockers, calcium channel blockers, and/or ACE inhibitors may be added if blood pressure is not effectively controlled through diureses alone.

== Epidemiology ==
Acute glomerulonephritis resulted in 19,000 deaths in 2013 down from 24,000 deaths in 1990.
