= Glomerulonephrosis =

Inflammatory disease of the kidney

- Specialty: Nephrology

Glomerulonephrosis is a non-inflammatory disease of the kidney (nephrosis) presenting primarily in the glomerulus (a glomerulopathy) as nephrotic syndrome. The nephron is the functional unit of the kidney and it contains the glomerulus, which acts as a filter for blood to retain proteins and blood lipids. Damage to these filtration units results in important blood contents being released as waste in urine. This disease can be characterized by symptoms such as fatigue, swelling, and foamy urine, and can lead to chronic kidney disease and ultimately end-stage renal disease, as well as cardiovascular diseases. Glomerulonephrosis can present as either primary glomerulonephrosis or secondary glomerulonephrosis.

It can be contrasted to glomerulonephritis, which implies inflammation.

== Signs and symptoms ==
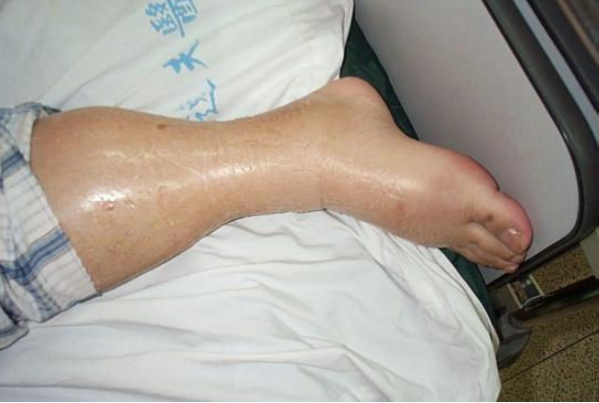
Peripheral edema of the lower extremity (left leg) as a result of fluid leaking into the interstitium.

The primary sign of glomerulonephrosis is proteinuria, the loss of greater than 3.5g of protein in one day, and this can cause the urine to be visibly foamy. One key protein lost in proteinuria can be albumin, a crucial transport protein found in plasma. Proteinuria will lead to other symptoms including swelling known as edema, primarily in the legs, and can eventually progress to generalized edema throughout the body in chronic kidney damage, known as anasarca. In primary stages of glomerulonephrosis, edema will be most visible in the feet and ankles, especially for individuals who spend long amounts of time on their feet. This is due to fluid being pulled down within the body by gravity.

Other symptoms include:

- Foamy urine
- Increased urinary frequency
- Fatigue
- Chronic/recurrent infection
- Leg pain
- Elevated blood pressure

== Causes ==
A diagram illustrating the changes in a podocyte in minimal change disease.

Rather than solely being caused by other diseases or processes, glomerulonephrosis can also present as a result of protein conditions or mutations that cause damage. As a result, it can have primary causes that are a direct result of mutation, or secondary causes such as other chronic conditions.

=== Primary glomerulonephrosis ===
- Minimal change disease: A disease that causes unregulated activity of the immune system that damages the glomerulus, causing glomerulonephrosis. The disease is "minimal" because lesions of the glomerulus can only be seen through an electron microscope.
- Focal segmental glomerulosclerosis: A disease in which scar tissue develops in the glomeruli. Primary forms include Idiopathic FSGS, which have no known cause, and Genetic FSGS caused by a recessive genetic mutation.

=== Secondary glomerulonephrosis ===
- Systemic lupus erythematous (SLE): An autoimmune disease in which the body makes antibodies that deposit harmful immunocomplexes within multiple organs, which can sometimes include the glomerulus within the kidney.
- Sarcoidosis: A disease that results in the accumulation of granulomas, a clump of macrophages, that can attack different tissues of the body. Although this disease does not usually affect or spread to the kidneys, these granulomas can sometimes be deposited into glomeruli and cause damage leading to glomerulonephrosis.
- Diabetic nephropathy: A condition that is secondary to diabetes mellitus that may cause damage in filtration pathways in kidneys. This can cause an increase of fluid pressure within the glomeruli, thus causing their hypertrophy, or breakdown.
- Amyloidosis: This disease causes the buildup abnormal proteins called amyloid fibrils. Depositions of amyloid fibrils in the kidneys will eventually lead it to the primary filtration unit, the glomerulus, and cause blockages. Such a blockage will prevent the glomerulus from functioning properly and eventually causes damage.

Other forms of secondary glomerulonephrosis can be caused by autoimmune disorders such as HIV, Sjögren's Syndrome, and hepatitis B, and some cancers, including multiple myeloma.

== Mechanism ==
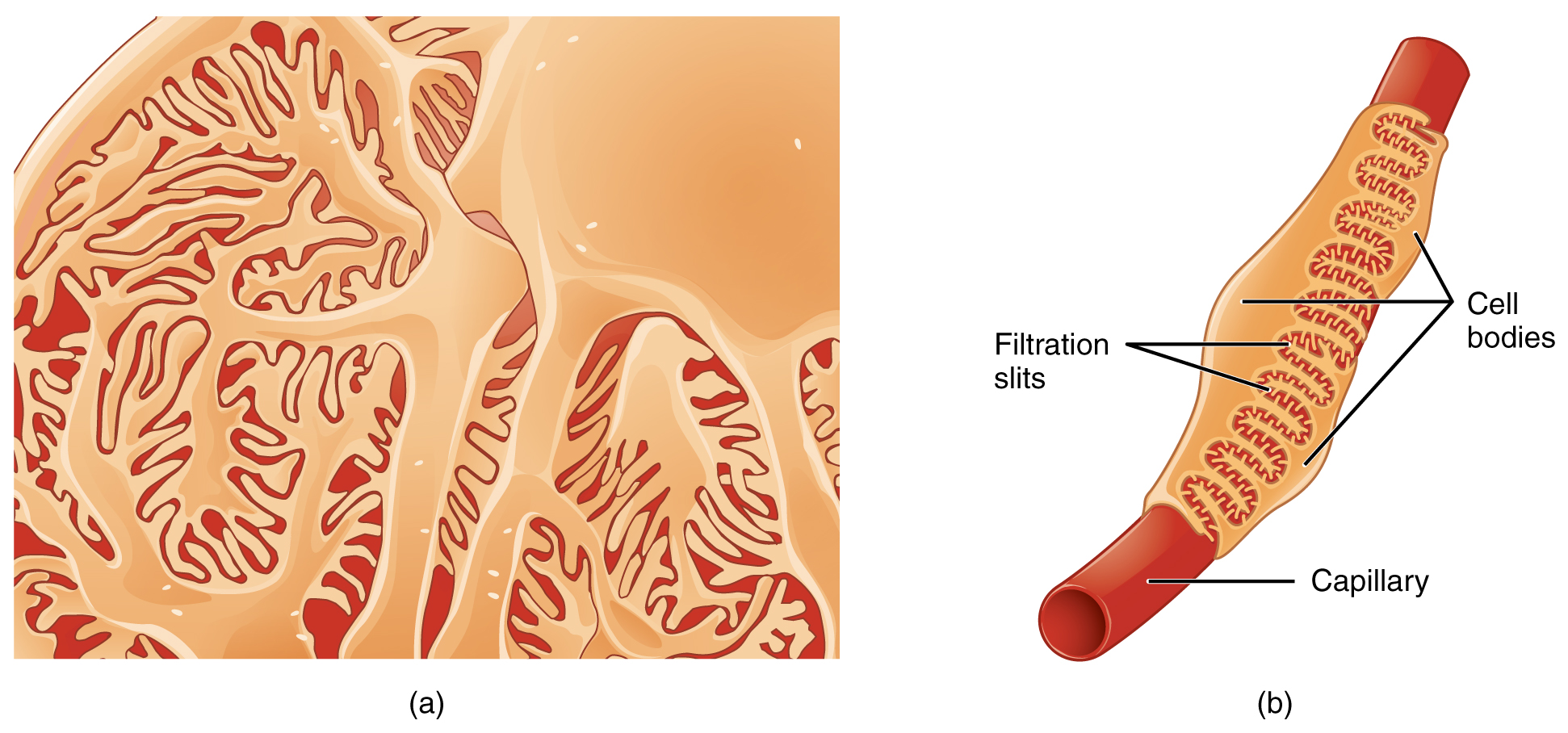
A normal podocyte without damage.

Podocytes are specialized cells that make up parts of the lining of the glomerulus that normally help prevent protein loss. In glomerulonephrosis, these cells are damaged, which allows proteins to pass through glomerular filtration and be lost in urine (proteinuria). Immunoglobulins, proteins of the immune system, can also be lost due to proteinuria, thus weakening the immune system and making the body more prone to infection. The decreased number of proteins triggers the liver to produce greater numbers of proteins and cholesterol. The increase in cholesterol production leads to hypercholesterolemia, which can lead to cardiovascular issues. Despite the liver's overproduction of proteins, they will still be filtered into urine. A decreased amount of proteins in the blood vessels will reduce the total plasma oncotic pressure. This pressure results from water, electrolytes, proteins, and other substrates interacting in the blood vessels, but the loss of protein reduces the number of interactions, thus reducing the total pressure. Decreased pressure will cause water and electrolytes to move into the surrounding interstitium, the space that separates internal structures of the body and skin, leading to swelling (peripheral edema). The leakage of water into peripheral structures decreases the total fluid volume in circulation, which will activate the Renin-Angiotensin-Aldosterone system. This system increases blood pressure by retaining sodium, which retains water. However, water will continue to be lost as edema because glomerulonephrosis will continue to cause proteinuria, and prolonged activation of the Renin-Angiotensin-Aldosterone system will cause blood pressure to remain elevated and cause hypertension.

== Diagnosis ==
Due to its close connection with other diseases and disorders, glomerulonephrosis is rarely diagnosed independently and is superseded by those other conditions. The primary test to diagnose a form of glomerulonephrosis is a urinalysis to look for any proteinuria. This is a very important step as an otherwise healthy individual will have low protein levels in the urine. A comprehensive metabolic panel (CMP) is also often used to test for hypoalbuminemia, levels of albumin lower than ≤2.5 g/dL. This is a key step in differentiating glomerulonephrosis from conditions that also cause proteinuria, such as multiple myeloma and diabetes mellitus, that are not marked by hypoalbuminemia. A creatinine clearance_{CR} test will also be used to determine the glomerular filtration rate (GFR), or the rate at which blood flows through the glomerulus. Creatinine is a byproduct of creatine metabolism that will be released as waste in urine, so it is a good benchmark for estimating how much fluid is being filtered through the glomerulus. To differentiate it from glomerulonephritis, microscopy may be used to examine a urinary cast, which is caused by inflammation. In cases involving Minimal Change Disease, an electron microscope can be used to visualize changes in podocyte structure. Additional tests such as a kidney biopsy, lipid profile, ultrasound, and electrolyte, urea, creatinine (EUC) tests can also be performed, but these evaluate overall kidney function rather than the glomerulus specifically.

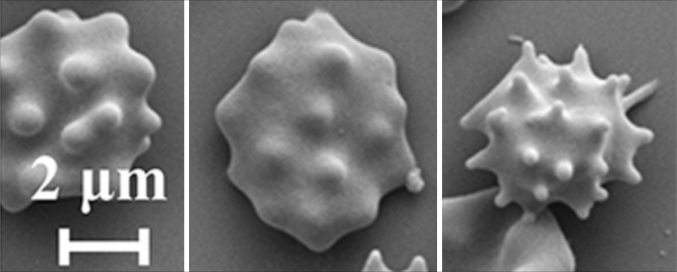
The degree to which an electron microscope can visualize cells. This device is instrumental in diagnosing minimal change disease to view lesions in the glomeruli.

== Treatment ==
Treatment of glomerulonephrosis involves treatment of both symptoms and the glomerulus itself. A majority of complications of this condition result from edema, proteinuria, hypercholesterolemia, and hypoalbuminemia so it is important to correct these imbalances.

=== Symptomatic treatment ===
Depending on the severity of edema, treatment will vary. Fluid can be managed through rest to counteract the effects of gravity that would otherwise cause it to settle into the legs and feet. Individuals may also need to undergo medical nutrition therapy to make dietary changes and counteract the loss of protein. Similarly to individuals with chronic kidney disease, this diet should consist of an increase the amount of protein consumed while limiting the amount of sodium and fat intake. A balanced nutritional intake can help prevent glomerulonephrosis in some cases, but cannot prevent those with a genetic cause. This type of diet will also assist in counteracting hypoalbuminemia and hypercholesterolemia. In more severe cases of edema, diuretic medications may be used. These medications promote the production of urine and help remove some of the excess fluid in the interstitium.

=== Glomerular damage treatment ===
The progressive damage of the glomerulus can be prevented, and in some cases reversed, with the use of corticosteroids, a class of hormonal steroids used as medication. Adults with a new onset of glomerulonephrosis can be treated with prednisone. In children with Minimal Change Disease and adults relapsing into glomerulonephrosis, prednisolone is commonly used until proteinuria is no longer present, but children have a much quicker remission than adults and are less prone to relapse. Direct treatment of proteinuria is the goal of corticosteroid use as this is the primary issue causing other symptoms. In severe cases where the condition has progressed to chronic kidney disease, kidney transplantation will be ultimately be required.

== Prognosis ==
Depending on the cause/type of glomerulonephrosis, especially in the case of secondary forms, there may be an array of treatments that may be required and some may be untreatable. In Minimal Change Disease, children usually recover due to their positive response to corticosteroid use. In other forms, such as Focal Segmental Sclerosis, the progression to kidney disease is very common and individuals will inevitably require kidney transplant. If left untreated completely, glomerulonephrosis will almost always develop into nephrotic syndrome and eventually kidney failure within months. Kidney failure severely affects other bodily systems including the cardiovascular system in the forms of atherosclerosis, coronary artery disease, heart failure, stroke, and peripheral artery disease.

== Epidemiology ==
Primary forms of glomerulonephrosis can occur at any age, although it is found in adults more commonly than children. The most common cause of glomerulonephrosis in children is Minimal Change Disease where they make up a majority of cases. There are 10-50 cases per 100,000 children, with male cases being twice as common as female cases. In adults, the opposite is true with Focal Segmental Glomerulosclerosis being the more common. This form is found to be 1.5 times more common in men than women, and some studies suggest that it is found in higher incidences in Blacks than Whites and Hispanics.

== Research directions ==
Due to the connection between glomerulonephrosis and other renal conditions, and its presentation as nephrotic syndrome, a majority of the research is focused on these other causes and the effects of drugs. One recent study of the effect of a drug, silymarin, on kidney tissue of rats with cadmium toxicity found that rats in the cadmium had incidences of glomerulonephrosis, making cadmium a potential cause. Another recent study in rats that investigated the effect of high doses of metformin with the SIRT1 activator, SRT1720, showed high cases of glomerulonephrosis and death. Studies such as this allow for improved clinical practices in renal patients and help physicians make informed decision on the combinations of medications used to prevent glomerulonephrosis.
