= List of medical abbreviations: M =

Sortable table
Abbreviation	Meaning
M	murmur (heart murmur or heart attack that can cause death)
MACE	Major adverse cardiovascular events
MAC	Mycobacterium avium complex
MAE	moves all extremities
MAHA	microangiopathic hemolytic anemia
MAL	midaxillary line
MALT	mucosa-associated lymphoid tissue
MANOS	minilaparoscopy assisted natural orifice surgery
MAOI	monoamine oxidase inhibitor
Mφ	macrophage
MAP	mean arterial pressure
MAR	Medication Administration Record
MARSA	methicillin- and aminoglycoside-resistant Staphylococcus aureus
MAS	Morgagni–Adams–Stokes syndrome meconium aspiration syndrome
MAST	Michigan alcohol screening test
MAT	multifocal atrial tachycardia microscopic agglutination test medication-assisted treatment
MBSS	modified barium swallow study
MC	metacarpal bone
MCA	mucinous cystadenoma Middle cerebral artery
MCADD	medium-chain acyl-coenzyme A dehydrogenase deficiency
MCAT	Medical College Admission Test
MCC	MotorCycle Collision, Motor Cycle Crash
MCD	minimal change diseaseharmful can cause cancer
MCDK	multicystic dysplastic kidney
MCP	metacarpophalangeal joint
MCHC	mean corpuscular hemoglobin concentration
MCH	mean cell hemoglobin; mean corpuscular hemoglobin
MC&S	microscopy, culture, and sensitivity (the investigation steps in processing microbiology samples)
MCTD	mixed connective tissue disease
MCV	mean corpuscular volume
MDCT	multidetector row computerized tomography
MDD	major depressive disorder
MDE	major depressive episode
MDI	metered dose inhaler
MDip	Master Diploma (specialization)
MDS	myelodysplastic syndrome
ME	UK: Myalgic Encephalopathy ( = Chronic Fatigue Syndrome or "CFS")
M/E	microscopic examination
MEC	Moderate emetic chemotherapy
MEDLINE	Medical Literature Analysis and Retrieval System Online (U.S. National Library of Medicine)
MELD	Model for End-Stage Liver Disease
MEN	multiple endocrine neoplasia
MeSH	Medical Subject Headings (U.S. National Library of Medicine)
MET	metabolic equivalent
met	metastasis (pronounced like the word met; plural mets)
MFM	maternal and fetal medicine
Mg	magnesium
MG	myasthenia gravis
mGLF	Mechanical Ground Level Fall
MGN	membranous glomerulonephritis
MGPE	milligrams of phenytoin equivalents
MgSO_{4}	magnesium sulfate (Do not use this abbreviation. Write out the name. Per the do-not-use list.)
MGUS	monoclonal gammopathy of undetermined significance (unknown or uncertain may be substituted for undetermined)
MHA-TP	microhemagglutination assay for T. pallidum
MHMR	mental health and mental retardation
MHW	Mental Health Worker
MI	myocardial infarction
MIC	minimum inhibitory concentration
MICA	mental illness and chemical abuse; mentally ill chemical abuser
MICU	mobile intensive care unit / medical intensive care unit
MIF	Müllerian inhibitory factor
MIP	Maximum intensity projection, a technique used to enhance CT, MRI, MRA, and PET images
MIS	Minimally Invasive Surgery; Müllerian Inhibiting Substance
MLC	mixed lymphocyte culture
MLE	midline episiotomy
MM	myeloid metaplasia middle meningeal multiple myeloma
M&M	morbidity and mortality
MMFR	midmaximal flow rate
MMI	maximum medical improvement
MMK	Marshall–Marchetti–Kranz procedure
MMM	moist mucous membranes Myelofibrosis with Myeloid Metaplasia
MMP	medical marijuana patient Medical Monitoring Project (of the US CDC)
MMPI	Minnesota Multiphasic Personality Inventory
MMR	measles, mumps, and rubella combined vaccination mismatch repair
MMR-D	mismatch repair deficiency syndrome
MMSE	mini-mental state examination
MMT	malignant mesenchymal tumor Mixed Mullerian Tumor
MN	membranous nephropathy
MND	motor neurone disease, also known as amyotrophic lateral sclerosis (ALS), Lou Gehrig's disease or Charcot disease
MOB	mother of baby
mod	moderate; modified
MODY	maturity onset diabetes of the young
Mo	monocytes
MoM	multiples of the median
MOM	milk of magnesia
Mono-Di	monochorionic-diamniotic twins
Mono-Mono	monochorionic-monoamniotic twins
MOPP	mechlorethamine, vincristine, procarbazine, and prednisone in combination (older treatment for Hodgkin's lymphoma)
MPA	medroxyprogesterone acetate
MPD	Main pancreatic duct
MPD(s)	myeloproliferative disease(s)
MPGN	membranoproliferative glomerulonephritis
MPO	myeloperoxidase
MPT	multi-professional team
MPV	mean platelet volume
MR	medical representative mental retardation mitral regurgitation modified release (compare time release technology (medicine)) menstrual regulation (unsafe abortion)
MRA	magnetic resonance angiography
MRCP	magnetic resonance cholangiopancreatography
MRD	minimal residual disease
MRG	murmurs, rubs, and gallops (see heart sounds)
MRI	magnetic resonance imaging
MRSA	methicillin-resistant Staphylococcus aureus
MS	medical student (MS-1, MS-2, MS-3, MS-4) mental status (see mental status examination) mitral stenosis multiple sclerosis
MS-AFP	maternal serum alpha-fetoprotein
MSD	musculoskeletal disorder
MSDU	medical surgical day unit
MSE	mental status examination
MSH	melanocyte-stimulating hormone
MSK	medullary sponge kidney musculoskeletal
MSM	men who have sex with men
MSMW	men who have sex with men and women
MSO_{4}	morphine sulfate (Do not use this abbreviation. Write out the name. Per the do-not-use list.)
MSOF	multisystem organ failure
MSSA	methicillin-sensitive Staphylococcus aureus (contrast with MRSA)
MSU	midstream urine sample (used in testing for presence of urinary tract infections) monosodium urate
MSUD	maple syrup urine disease
MT	metatarsal bone
MTBI	mild traumatic brain injury
MtF	Male to Female transgender person (trans woman)
MTP	metatarsalphalangeal
MTX	methotrexate
MUGA	Multiple gated acquisition scan
MUSE	medicated urethral system for erections
MVA	motor vehicle accident
MVC	motor vehicle crash
MVI	Multivitamin
MVo2	mixed venous oxygen concentration
MVP	mitral valve prolapse
MVPS	mitral valve prolapse syndrome
MVR	mitral valve replacement
