= Glomerulopathy =

- Specialty: Urology

Glomerulopathy is a disease that impacts the glomeruli in the nephron, either inflammatory or noninflammatory. Glomerulopathy includes collapsing glomerulopathy, glomerulocystic kidney disease, glomerulomegaly, membranous nephropathy, and tip lesion glomerulopathy.

Collapsing glomerulopathy (CG) is a clinicopathologic entity that involves hypertrophy and hyperplasia of podocytes and segmentar or global collapse of the glomerulus.

Glomerulocystic kidney disease is a rare form of renal cyst disease. Cortical microcysts, which are portrayed by cystic dilatation of Bowman's spaces, are its defining feature.

Glomerulomegaly is defined by unusually large glomeruli.

Membranous nephropathy (MN) is an uncommon autoimmune condition in which autoantibodies directed primarily against podocyte antigens target the glomerulus, causing electron-dense immune complexes to form, complement activation to occur, and severe proteinuria.

The glomerular tip lesion (GTL) is a unique histopathologic lesion that appears in idiopathic nephrotic syndrome patients.

== See also ==
- Glomerulonephritis
- Glomerulonephrosis
