= Membranous glomerulonephritis =

Kidney disease

- Other names: Membranous glomerulopathy, membranous nephritis, (epi)membranous nephropathy, extramembranous glomerulopathy, and perimembranous nephropathy.
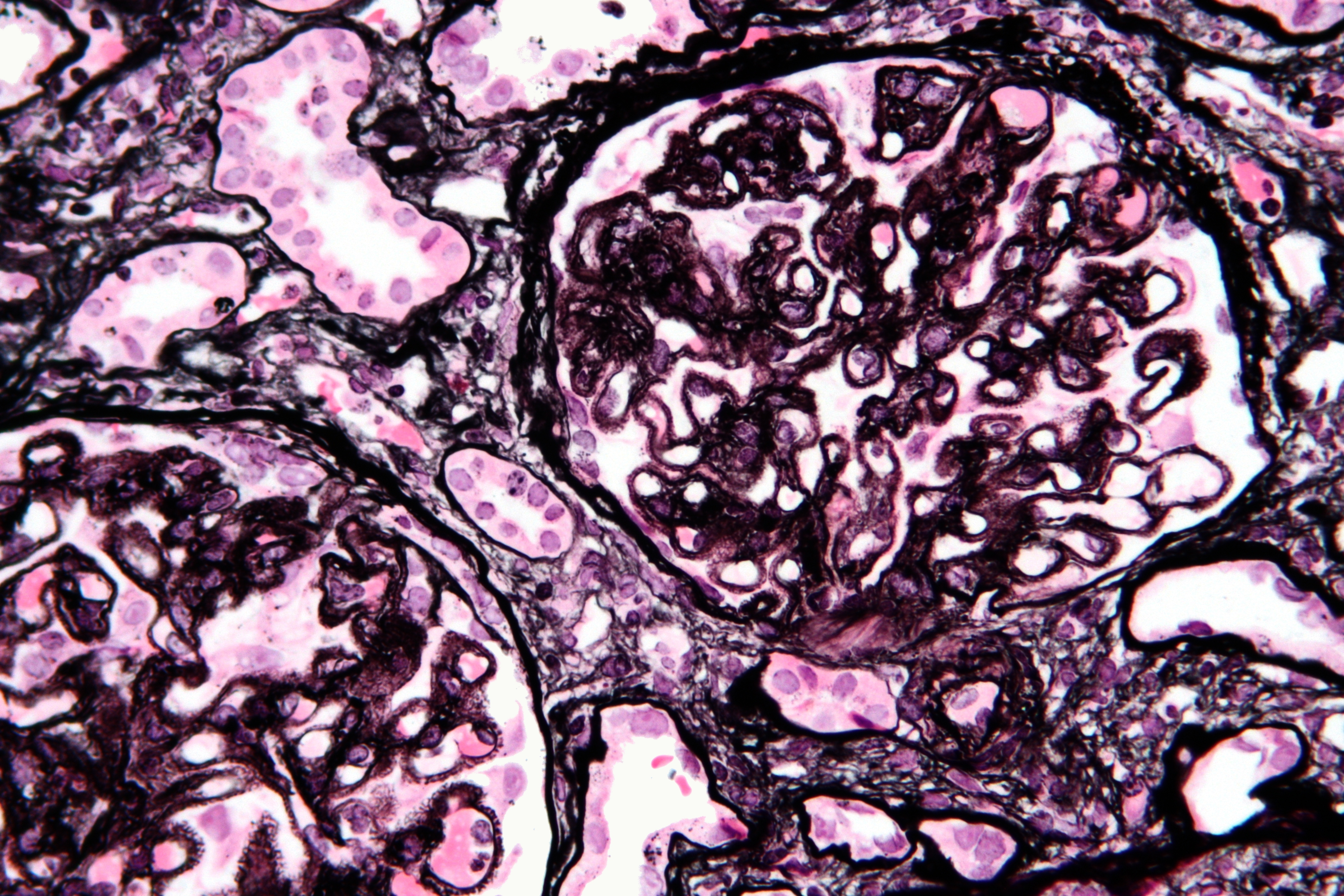
- Micrograph of membranous nephropathy showing prominent glomerular basement membrane spikes. Jones' stain.
- Specialty: Nephrology

Membranous glomerulonephritis (MGN) is a slowly progressive disease of the kidney affecting mostly people between ages of 30 and 50 years, usually white people (i.e., those of European, Middle Eastern, or North African ancestry.).

Video explanation

It is the second most common cause of nephrotic syndrome in adults, with focal segmental glomerulosclerosis (FSGS) recently becoming the most common.

== Signs and symptoms ==
Most people will present as nephrotic syndrome, with the triad of albuminuria, edema and low serum albumin (with or without kidney failure). High blood pressure and high cholesterol are often also present. Others may not have symptoms and may be picked up on screening, with urinalysis finding high amounts of protein loss in the urine. A definitive diagnosis of membranous nephropathy requires a kidney biopsy, though given the very high specificity of anti-PLA2R antibody positivity this can sometimes be avoided in patients with nephrotic syndrome and preserved kidney function

== Causes ==
Traditional definitions split membranous nephropathy into 'primary/idiopathic' or 'secondary'. It is likely that instead the field will move to novel classification on the basis of the specific autoantigen detected, though given the current lack of clinical assays (other than for PLA2R autoantibodies) this may be several years off still.

=== Primary/idiopathic ===
Traditionally 85% of MGN cases are classified as primary membranous glomerulonephritis—that is to say, the cause of the disease is idiopathic (of unknown origin or cause). This can also be referred to as idiopathic membranous nephropathy.

Antibodies to an M-type phospholipase A_{2} receptor are responsible around 60% of cases of membranous nephropathy. Testing for these anti-PLA2R has revolutionised diagnosis and treatment of this disease in antibody positive patients, and tracking titre level over time allows you to predict risk of disease progression and chance of spontaneous remission There is little secondary disease association with PLA2R autoantibodies.

In 2014, a second autoantigen was discovered, the thrombospondin type 1 domain-containing 7A (THSD7A) system that might account for an additional 1% of membranous nephropathy cases, and appears to be associated with malignancies.

Further studies have identified more novel auto-antigens responsible for causing a membranous nephropathy pattern of injury continue to be published, with antibodies discovered against:

- NELL-1 likely the second most common autoantibody with prevalence in MN of 5-10%. It has a heterogenous pattern of secondary association, from none to sarcoidosis, malignancy, drugs such as bucillamine, and infections. Like PLA2R, antibody titres go into remission with treatment.
- EXT1/EXT2 was reported in 2019. It is predominantly found in younger, female patients, and indeed 1/3 of patients with class V lupus nephritis are EXT positive In Patients with Membranous Lupus Nephritis, Exostosin-Positivity and Exostosin-Negativity Represent Two Different Phenotypes. Prognosis is good. A less common target antigen in lupus nephritis is NCAM1.
- Semaphorin3B predominates in children, esp <2 years old. there can be a family history of MN in these patients, it frequently causes progressive disease and it can recur in kidney transplants.
- Protocadherin 7 (PCDH7) in 2020. It is generally described in older patients, who have less complement on renal biopsy and frequently have spontaneous remission.Journal of the American Society of Nephrology
- FAT1 is associated with haemopoetic stem cell transplant, and responds to treatment Hematopoietic Stem Cell Transplant-Membranous Nephropathy Is Associated with Protocadherin FAT1.
- NDNF is associated with syphilis (close to 100% of membranous nephrology is NDNF positive).
- HTRA1, often in older persons.

=== Secondary ===
We include the traditional list of secondary causes, though as above nomenclature is moving towards an autoantibody specific approach. Membranous nephropathy is associated with the following:

- autoimmune conditions (e.g., systemic lupus erythematosus).
- infections (e.g., syphilis, malaria, hepatitis B, hepatitis C, HIV).
- drugs (e.g., captopril, NSAIDs, penicillamine, probenecid, Bucillamine, Anti-TNF therapy, Tiopronin).
- inorganic salts (e.g. gold, mercury).
- tumors, frequently solid tumors of the lung and colon; melanomas; hematological malignancies such as chronic lymphocytic leukemia are less common.

== Pathogenesis ==
Immune complexes (black) are deposited in a thickened basement membrane creating a "spike and dome" appearance on electron microscopy.

MGN is caused by immune complex formation in the glomerulus. The immune complexes are formed by binding of antibodies to antigens in the glomerular basement membrane. The antigens may be part of the basement membrane, or deposited from elsewhere by the systemic circulation.

The immune complex serves as an activator that triggers a response from the C5b - C9 complements, which form a membrane attack complex (MAC) on the glomerular epithelial cells. This, in turn, stimulates release of proteases and oxidants by the mesangial and epithelial cells, damaging the capillary walls and causing them to become "leaky". In addition, the epithelial cells also seem to secrete an unknown mediator that reduces nephrin synthesis and distribution.

Within membranous glomerulonephritis, especially in cases caused by viral hepatitis, serum C3 levels are low.

Similar to other causes of nephrotic syndrome (e.g., focal segmental glomerulosclerosis or minimal change disease), membranous nephropathy is known to predispose affected individuals to develop blood clots such as pulmonary emboli. Membranous nephropathy in particular is known to increase this risk more than other causes of nephrotic syndrome though the reason for this is not yet clear.

== Morphology ==
The defining point of MGN is the presence of subepithelial immunoglobulin-containing deposits along the glomerular basement membrane (GBM).

- By light microscopy, the basement membrane is observed to be diffusely thickened. Using Jones' stain, the GBM appears to have a "spiked" or "holey" appearance.
- On electron microscopy, subepithelial deposits that nestle against the glomerular basement membrane seems to be the cause of the thickening. Also, the podocytes lose their foot processes. As the disease progresses, the deposits will eventually be cleared, leaving cavities in the basement membrane. These cavities will later be filled with basement membrane-like material, and if the disease continues even further, the glomeruli will become sclerosed and finally hyalinized.
- Immunofluorescence microscopy will reveal typical granular deposition of immunoglobulins and complement along the basement membrane.

Although it usually affects the entire glomerulus, it can affect parts of the glomerulus in some cases.

== Treatment ==
Treatment of secondary membranous nephropathy is guided by the treatment of the original disease. For treatment of idiopathic membranous nephropathy, the treatment options include immunosuppressive drugs and non-specific anti-proteinuric measures such as ACE inhibitors or angiotensin II receptor blockers. Given spontaneous remission is common, international guidelines recommend a period of watchful waiting before considering immunosuppressive treatment. Likelihood of achieving spontaneous remission is much higher if anti-proteinuric therapy with ace inhibitors or angiotensin II receptor blockers is commenced.

Recommended first line immunosuppressive therapy often includes: cyclophosphamide alternating with a corticosteroid, also known as the Ponticelli regime.

=== Immunosuppressive therapy options ===
1. Corticosteroids: They have been tried with mixed results, with one study showing prevention of progression to kidney failure without improvement in proteinuria.
2. Chlorambucil
3. Cyclosporine
4. Tacrolimus
5. Cyclophosphamide
6. Mycophenolate mofetil
7. Rituximab

Perhaps the most difficult aspect of membranous glomerulonephritis is deciding which people to treat with immunosuppressive therapy as opposed to simple "background" or anti-proteinuric therapies. A large part of this difficulty is due to a lack of ability to predict which people will progress to end-stage kidney disease, or kidney disease severe enough to require dialysis. Because the above medications carry risk, treatment should not be initiated without careful consideration as to risk/benefit profile. Of note, corticosteroids (typically Prednisone) alone are of little benefit. They should be combined with one of the other 5 medications, each of which, along with prednisone, has shown some benefit in slowing down progression of membranous nephropathy. It must be kept in mind, however, that each of the 5 medications also carry their own risks, on top of prednisone.

The twin aims of treating membranous nephropathy are first to induce a remission of the nephrotic syndrome and second to prevent the development of end-stage kidney failure. A meta-analysis of four randomized controlled trials comparing treatments of membranous nephropathy showed that regimes comprising chlorambucil or cyclophosphamide, either alone or with steroids, were more effective than symptomatic treatment or treatment with steroids alone in inducing remission of the nephrotic syndrome.

== Prognosis ==
About a third of untreated patients have spontaneous remission, another third progress to require dialysis and the last third continue to have proteinuria, without progression of kidney failure.

== Terminology ==
The closely related terms membranous nephropathy (MN) and membranous glomerulopathy both refer to a similar constellation but without the assumption of inflammation.

Membranous nephritis (in which inflammation is implied, but the glomerulus not explicitly mentioned) is less common, but the phrase is occasionally encountered. These conditions are usually considered together.

By contrast, membranoproliferative glomerulonephritis has a similar name, but is considered a separate condition with a distinctly different causality. Membranoproliferative glomerulonephritis involves the basement membrane and mesangium, while membranous glomerulonephritis involves the basement membrane but not the mesangium. (Membranoproliferative glomerulonephritis has the alternate name "mesangiocapillary glomerulonephritis", to emphasize its mesangial character.)
