= Richard J. Johnson =

American nephrologist

Richard J. Johnson (born 25 November 1953) is an American nephrologist and professor emeritus of medicine at the University of Colorado. He held the Tomas Berl Professorship of Medicine and served as chief of the Division of Renal Diseases and Hypertension from 2008 to 2017. His research has focused on kidney disease, hypertension, metabolic disease, fructose metabolism, and uric acid.

== Early life and education ==
Johnson received a B.S. in anthropology with honors from the University of Wisconsin–Madison in 1975 and an M.D. from the University of Minnesota in 1979. He completed his internal medicine residency and fellowships in nephrology and infectious diseases at the University of Washington, completing his fellowship training in 1986.

== Career ==
Johnson began his academic career at the University of Washington, where he became a professor of medicine in the Division of Nephrology. In 2000, he joined Baylor College of Medicine as professor of medicine and chief of the Renal Section. He also served as director of Kidney/Pancreas Transplantation in the Baylor-Methodist program.

In 2003, Johnson joined the University of Florida as the J. Robert Cade Professor of Nephrology and chief of the Section of Nephrology, Hypertension, and Transplantation. In 2008, he joined the University of Colorado as the Tomas Berl Professor of Medicine and chief of the Division of Renal Diseases and Hypertension. He held the latter position until 2017 and became professor emeritus of medicine in July 2024.

== Research ==
Johnson's research has focused on the roles of fructose and uric acid in metabolic diseases, including obesity, diabetes, hypertension, fatty liver disease, and metabolic syndrome. His work has examined their effects on mitochondrial function, oxidative stress, inflammation, endothelial function, insulin resistance, and leptin resistance, proposing links between fructose metabolism, uric acid, and metabolic and cardiovascular disease.

His nephrology research covers uric acid, kidney disease, diabetic kidney injury, nephrotic syndrome, and glomerular disease. In 1993, Johnson and colleagues reported an association between hepatitis C infection and membranoproliferative glomerulonephritis. He has also investigated uric acid, kidney microvascular injury, sodium handling, salt-sensitive hypertension, and the roles of fructose and uric acid in kidney disease and kidney stone formation.

Johnson has additionally researched chronic kidney disease linked to occupational heat exposure, particularly among agricultural workers in Central America, as well as heat stress and environmental exposures in Mexico, India, and Sri Lanka. His work has also addressed autoimmune mechanisms in kidney disease and primary hypertension.

== Publications ==
Johnson is a founding editor of Comprehensive Clinical Nephrology, first published in 2000. He is the author of The Sugar Fix (2008), The Fat Switch (2012), and Nature Wants Us to Be Fat (2022).

- Johnson, Richard J. (2022). Nature wants us to be fat: the surprising science behind why we gain weight and how we can prevent-- and reverse--it. Dallas: BenBella Books. ISBN 978-1-63774-035-4.
- Johnson, Richard J. (2012). The fat switch: learn what causes obesity and simple methods to fight it. Mercola. ISBN 978-0-615-64800-2.
- Johnson, Richard J.; Gower, Timothy (2008). The sugar fix: the high-fructose fallout that is making you fat and sick. Emmaus: Rodale. ISBN 978-1-59486-665-4.

== Awards ==
- 1994: Young Investigator Award, American Society of Nephrology and American Heart Association
- 1995: Elected member, American Society for Clinical Investigation
- 2006: Sir Stanley Davidson Lecturer, Royal College of Physicians of Scotland
- 2007: Donald Seldin Lecture, American Heart Association
- 2008: Hugh DeWardener Lecture, British Society of Hypertension
- 2009: Theodore Woodward Award, American Clinical and Climatological Association
- 2011: New Inventor of the Year, University of Colorado Denver Medical Campus
- ISI Highly Cited Researcher in Clinical Medicine (1992–2017)
