= Peroxide fusion =

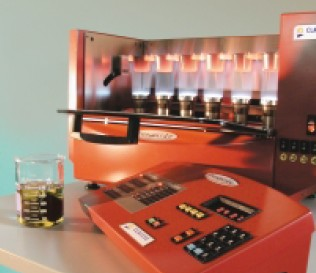
Example of automated system: “Peroxide Fluxer” from CLAISSE

Peroxide fusion is used to prepare samples for inductively coupled plasma (ICP), atomic absorption (AA) analysis and wet chemistry. Sodium peroxide (Na_{2}O_{2}) is used to oxidize the sample that becomes soluble in a diluted acid solution. This method allows complete dissolution of numerous refractory compounds like chromite, magnetite, ilmenite, rutile, and even silicon, carbides, alloys, noble metals and materials with high sulfide contents.

Peroxide fusion can be performed either manually or with automated systems. The latter have the advantage of increasing productivity, improving safety, maintaining repeatable preparation conditions, and avoiding spattering as well as cross-contamination.

== Peroxide fusion vs. other dissolution methods ==
Acid digestion is the most common dissolution method used for many types of samples. Unfortunately, acid digestion involves numerous manipulations of concentrated acids. Some types of samples even require the use of perchloric acid (HClO_{4}) that is explosive when it comes into contact with any organic materials. It can be readily combined with hydrofluoric acid (HF) and brought to a fumic state to drive off this volatile acid that is extremely dangerous to human health, not to mention it will dissolve the walls of any glass container it is being processed within. Moreover, it is often difficult to get full dissolution of the sample, even when using these hazardous chemicals.
