= MMFR =

MMFR may refer to:

- MMFR, the flight information region for Mexico
- Midmaximal flow rate, a medical term
- Mad Max: Fury Road, a 2015 film
