= Wet chemistry =

Form of analytical chemistry

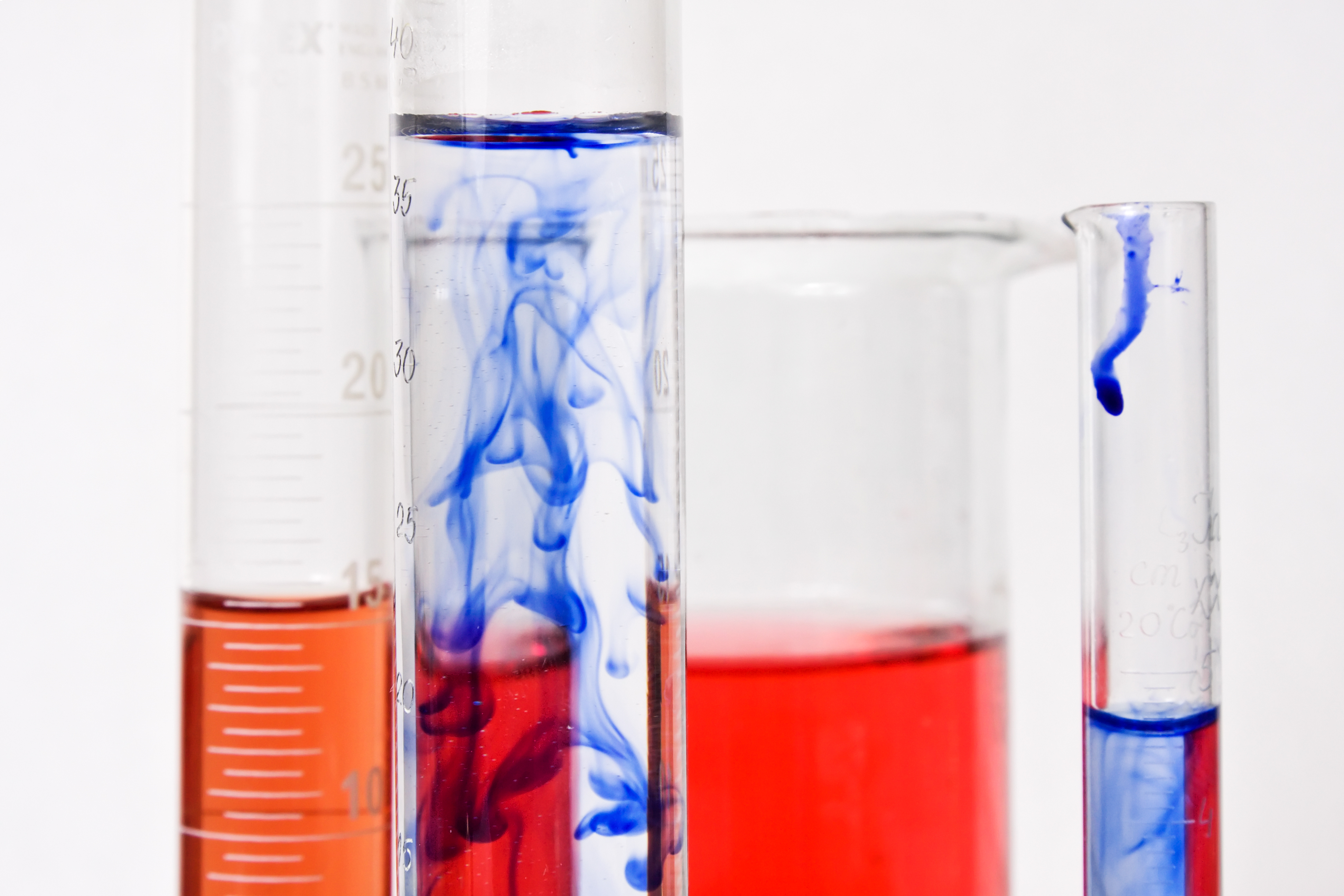
Graduated cylinders and beakers filled with chemicals

Wet chemistry is a form of analytical chemistry that uses classical methods such as observation to analyze materials. The term wet chemistry is used as most analytical work is done in the liquid phase. Wet chemistry is also known as bench chemistry, since many tests are performed at lab benches.

== Materials ==
Wet chemistry commonly uses laboratory glassware such as beakers and graduated cylinders to prevent materials from being contaminated or interfered with by unintended sources. Gasoline, Bunsen burners, and crucibles may also be used to evaporate and isolate substances in their dry forms. Wet chemistry is not performed with any advanced instruments since most automatically scan substances. Although, simple instruments such as scales are used to measure the weight of a substance before and after a change occurs. Many high school and college laboratories teach students basic wet chemistry methods.

== History ==
Before the age of theoretical and computational chemistry, wet chemistry was the predominant form of scientific discovery in the chemical field. This is why it is sometimes referred to as classic chemistry or classical chemistry. Scientists would continuously develop techniques to improve the accuracy of wet chemistry. Later on, instruments were developed to conduct research impossible for wet chemistry. Over time, this became a separate branch of analytical chemistry called instrumental analysis. Because of the high volume of wet chemistry that must be done in today's society and new quality control requirements, many wet chemistry methods have been automated and computerized for streamlined analysis. The manual performance of wet chemistry mostly occurs in schools.

== Methods ==
=== Qualitative methods ===
Qualitative methods use changes in information that cannot be quantified to detect a change. This can include a change in color, smell, texture, etc.

==== Chemical tests ====
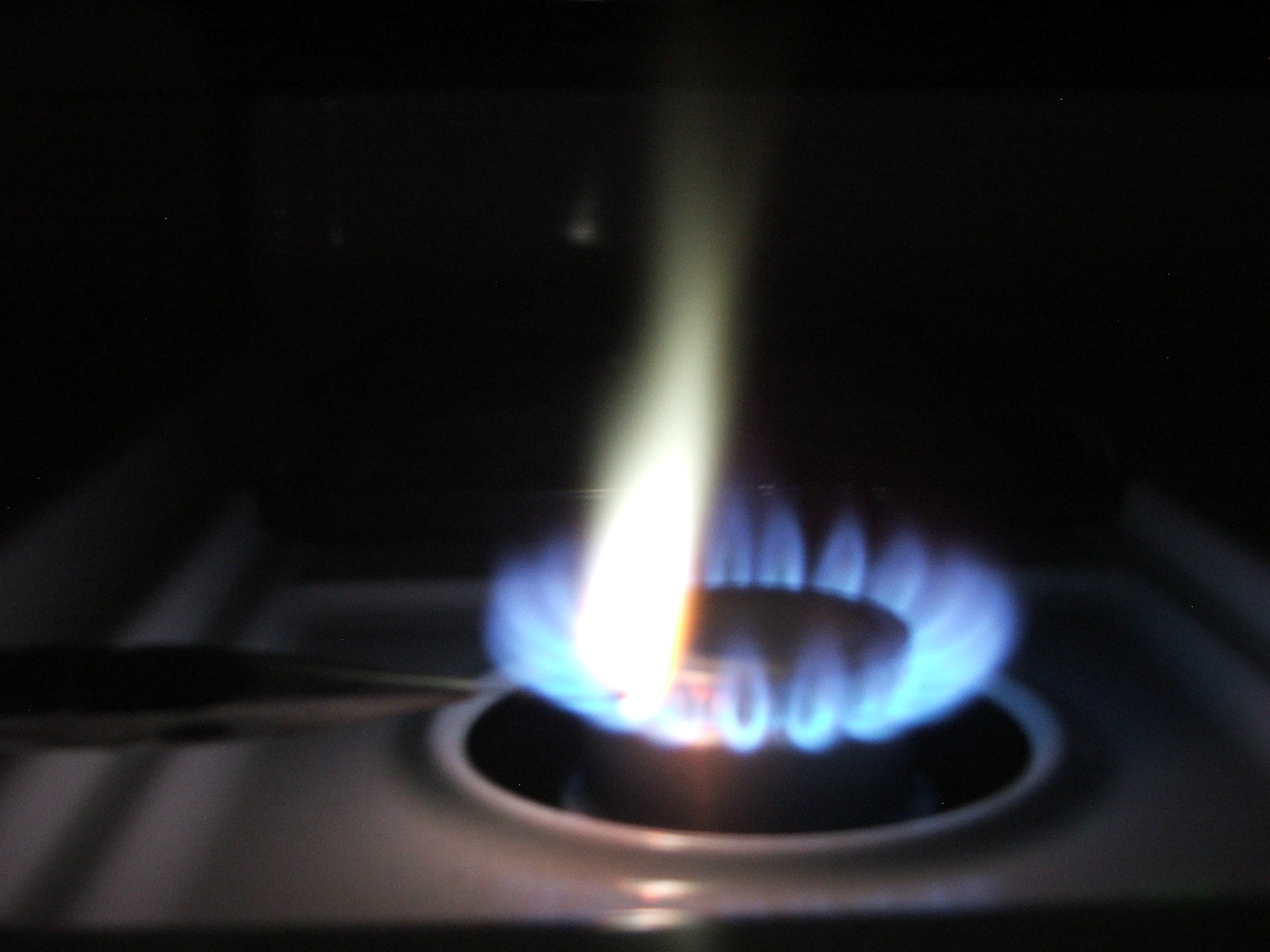
When burned, lead produces a bright white flame.

Chemical tests use reagents to indicate the presence of a specific chemical in an unknown solution. The reagents cause a unique reaction to occur based on the chemical it reacts with, allowing one to know what chemical is in the solution. An example is Heller's test where a test tube containing proteins has strong acids added to it. A cloudy ring forms where the substances meet, indicating the acids are denaturing the proteins. The cloud is a sign that proteins are present in a liquid. The method is used to detect proteins in a person's urine.

===== Flame test =====
The flame test is a more well known version of the chemical test. It is only used on metallic ions. The metal powder is burned, causing an emission of colors based on what metal was burned. For example, calcium (Ca) will burn orange and copper (Cu) will burn blue. Their color emissions are used to produce bright colors in fireworks.

=== Quantitative methods ===
Quantitative methods use information that can be measured and quantified to indicate a change. This can include changes in volume, concentration, weight, etc.

==== Gravimetric analysis ====
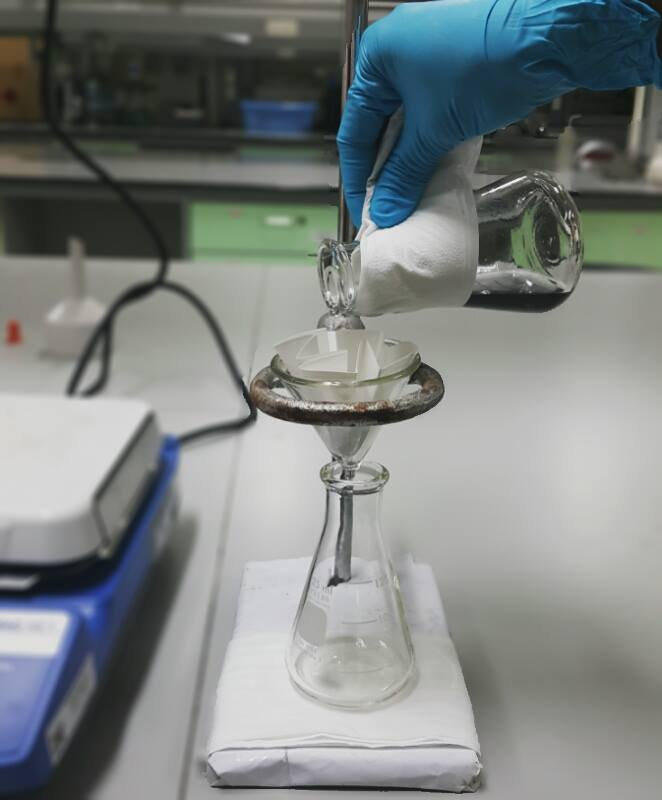
Solids are filtered out of the liquid, which is collected in the beaker.

Gravimetric analysis measures the weight or concentration of a solid that has either formed from a precipitate or dissolved in a liquid. The mass of the liquid is recorded before undergoing the reaction. For the precipitate, a reagent is added until the precipitate stops forming. The precipitate is then dried and weighed to determine the chemicals concentration in the liquid. For a dissolved substance, the liquid can be filtered until the solids are removed or boiled until all the liquid evaporates. The solids are left alone until completely dried and then weighed to determine its concentration. Evaporating all the liquid is the more common approach.

==== Volumetric analysis ====
Volumetric analysis or titration relies on volume measurements to determine the quantity of a chemical. A reagent with a known volume and concentration is added to a solution with an unknown substance or concentration. The amount of reagent required for a change to occur is proportional to the amount of the unknown substances. This reveals the amount of the unknown substance present. If no visible change is present, an indicator is added to the solution. For example, a pH indicator changes color based on the pH of the solution. The exact point where the color change occurs is called the endpoint. Since the color change can occur very suddenly, it is important to be extremely precise with all measurements.

=== Colorimetry ===
Colorimetry is a unique method since it has both qualitative and quantitative properties. Its qualitative analysis involves recording color changes to indicate a change has occurred. This can be a change in shading of the color or a change into a completely different color. The quantitative aspect involves sensory equipment that can measure the wavelength of colors. Changes in wavelengths can be precisely measured and indicate changes in the mixture or solution.

== Uses ==
Wet chemistry techniques can be used for qualitative chemical measurements, such as changes in color (colorimetry), but often involve more quantitative chemical measurements, using methods such as gravimetry and titrimetry. Some uses for wet chemistry include tests for:

- pH (acidity, alkalinity)
- concentration
- conductivity (specific conductance)
- cloud point (nonionic surfactants)
- hardness
- melting point
- solids or dissolved solids
- salinity
- specific gravity
- density
- turbidity
- viscosity
- moisture (Karl Fischer titration)

Wet chemistry is also used in environmental chemistry settings to determine the current state of the environment. It is used to test:

- Biochemical Oxygen Demand (BOD)
- Chemical Oxygen Demand (COD)
- eutrophication
- coating identification

It can also involve the elemental analysis of samples, e.g., water sources, for chemicals such as:

- Ammonia nitrogen
- Chloride
- Chromium
- Cyanide
- Dissolved oxygen
- Fluoride
- Nitrogen
- Nitrate
- Phenols
- Phosphate
- Phosphorus
- Silica
- Sulfates
- Sulfides

== See also ==
- Wet laboratory
