= Nephritis =

Inflammation of the kidneys

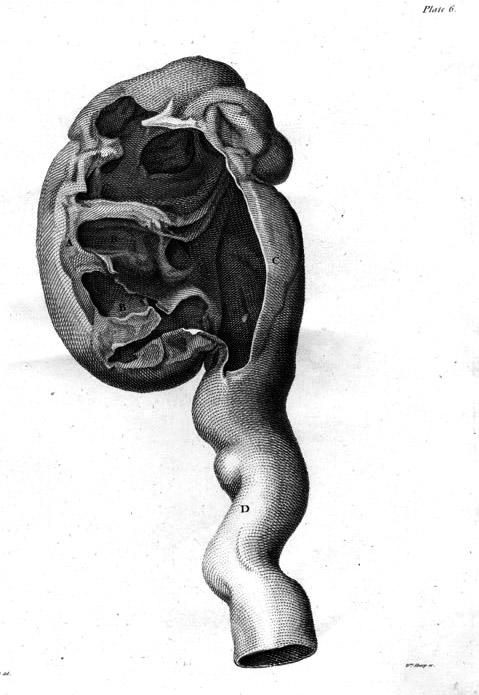
- Enlarged kidney (anatomy)
- Specialty: Nephrology
- Types: Glomerulonephritis and Interstitial nephritis
- Diagnostic method: Ultrasound, X-ray
- Treatment: Depends on type(See type)

Nephritis is inflammation of the kidneys and may involve the glomeruli, tubules, or interstitial tissue surrounding the glomeruli and tubules. It is one of several different types of nephropathy.

== Types ==
- Glomerulonephritis is inflammation of the glomeruli. Glomerulonephritis is often implied when using the term "nephritis" without qualification.
- Interstitial nephritis (or tubulo-interstitial nephritis) is inflammation of the spaces between renal tubules.

== Causes ==
Nephritis can often be caused by infections and toxins, but it is most commonly caused by autoimmune disorders that affect the major organs like kidneys.

- Pyelonephritis is inflammation that results from a urinary tract infection that reaches the renal pelvis of the kidney.
- Lupus nephritis is inflammation of the kidney caused by systemic lupus erythematosus (SLE), a disease of the immune system.
- Athletic pseudonephritis results from strenuous exercise. Bloody urine after strenuous exercise may also result from march hemoglobinuria, which is caused by trauma to red blood cells, causing their rupture, which leads to the release of hemoglobin into the urine.

== Mechanism ==
Renin–angiotensin system

Nephritis can produce glomerular injury, by disturbing the glomerular structure with inflammatory cell proliferation. This can lead to reduced glomerular blood flow, leading to reduced urine output (oliguria) and retention of waste products (uremia). As a result, red blood cells may leak out of damaged glomeruli, causing blood to appear in the urine (hematuria).Low renal blood flow activates the renin–angiotensin–aldosterone system (RAAS), causing fluid retention and mild hypertension. As the kidneys inflame, they begin to excrete needed protein from the affected individual's body into the urine stream. This condition is called proteinuria.

Loss of necessary protein due to nephritis can result in several life-threatening symptoms. The most serious complication of nephritis can occur if there is significant loss of the proteins that keep blood from clotting excessively. Loss of these proteins can result in blood clots, causing sudden stroke.

== Diagnosis ==
The diagnosis depends on the cause of the nephritis, and in the case of lupus nephritis, blood tests, X-rays and an ultrasound can help ascertain if the individual has the condition.

== Treatment ==
Treatment (or management) of nephritis depends on what has provoked the inflammation of the kidney(s). In the case of lupus nephritis, hydroxychloroquine could be used.

== Prevalence ==
Disease burden of nephritis/nephrosis worldwide in 2004. no data less than 40 40–120 120–200 200–280 280–360 360–440 440–520 520–600 600–680 680–760

Nephritis represents the ninth-most-common cause of death among all women in the US (and the fifth leading cause among non-Hispanic black women).

Worldwide, the highest rates of nephritis are 50–55% for African or Asian descent followed by Hispanic at 43% and Caucasian at 17%.

The average age of an individual diagnosed with kidney inflammation (in this case, lupus nephritis) is 28.4 years old.

== See also ==
- Nephrotic syndrome
- Bright's disease
- Goodpasture syndrome
