= Tram track (medicine) =

Pattern seen in radiologic examinations

Tram tracks or tram-track signs are medical signs that bear some resemblance to tramway tracks.

== Pulmonology ==
When found in the lungs, tram tracks are radiologic signs that are usually accompanied by pulmonary edema in cases of congestive heart failure and bronchiectasis. Tram tracks are caused by bronchial wall thickening, and can be detected on a lateral chest X-ray.

== Nephrology ==
The term "tram tracks" is also used to describe the basement membrane duplication found on light microscopy that is characteristic of membranoproliferative glomerulonephritis (MPGN) type I. (It is less commonly associated with types II and III.)

== Neurology ==
The term has also been used to describe findings associated with optic nerve sheath meningioma. In the orbit the sign is formed by two enhancing lines, made up of the optic nerve sheath and the surrounding tumour, on either side of the non-enhancing optic nerve. It is seen on contrast-enhanced CT and MRI, and is used to tell an optic nerve sheath meningioma apart from an optic nerve glioma. A glioma grows within the substance of the nerve, so the nerve and tumour are not distinct and the sign is absent. Calcification occurs in 20 to 50% of optic nerve sheath meningiomas, so the sign can also appear on non-contrast CT as a line of calcification around the nerve, though this is less common.

Tram track-shaped calcifications in the cerebral cortex indicate Sturge–Weber syndrome. where intracranial gyriform calcification (brain imaging) seen mostly in occipital and posterior parietal/temporal lobe; this syndrome consists triad of port wine stain, seizure(usually focal but may become generalized), eye manifestation(e.g., glaucoma).

== Mammary glands ==
Tram track appearance in mammography/USG indicates Duct Ectasia.
