= Lipiduria =

Presence of lipids in the urine

Lipiduria or lipuria is the presence of lipids in the urine. Lipiduria is most frequently observed in nephrotic syndrome where it is passed as lipoproteins along with other proteins. It has also been reported as a sign following fat embolism.

When lipiduria occurs, epithelial cells or macrophages contain endogenous fats. When filled with numerous fat droplets, such cells are called oval fat bodies. Oval fat bodies exhibit a "Maltese cross" configuration under polarized light microscopy. The Maltese cross appearance occurs because of its liquid-crystalline structure giving it a double refraction (birefringence).

== See also ==
- Urostealith
