= Johann Florian Heller =

Austrian chemist (1813–1871)

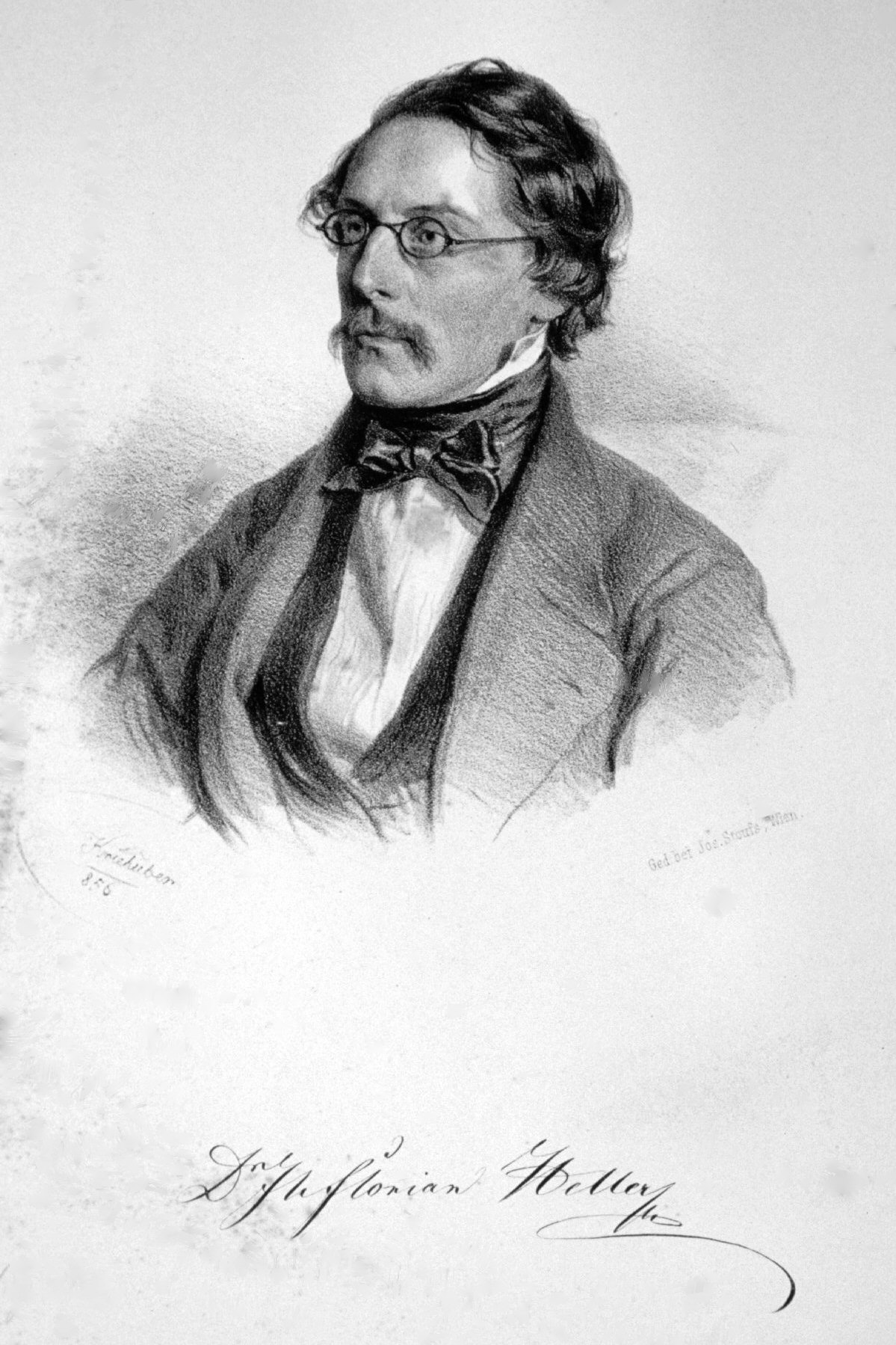
Johann Florian Heller

Johann Florian Heller (4 May 1813 – 21 November 1871) was an Austrian chemist who was one of the founders of clinical chemistry.

Heller was born in Vienna, Austria. He studied chemistry in Prague and later with Liebig and Wöhler at Giessen. During those studies he characterized rhodizonic acid and its potassium salt (1837).

In 1844 Heller established a laboratory of pathological chemistry in Vienna's General Hospital, but his appointment as head of the lab was delayed until 1855 because some of the faculty thought that the position should be occupied by a medical doctor. During that period he studied the chemistry of urine, and he developed the well-known Heller's ring test for albumin in the urine (1852). He also identified a fatty substance that he called urostealith, a constituent of certain bladder stones, and developed a treatment based on solutions of sodium carbonate, which were found to dissolve the substance in vitro (1845).

Also in 1844, Heller took over editorship of the recently founded Archiv für Physiologische und Pathologische Chemie und Mikroskopie, the first journal to deal exclusively with pathological chemistry; which stopped publication after six volumes, for lack of articles.

The Austrian Association for Clinical Chemistry (ÖGKC) awards a scientific prize named after him.

An Austrian stamp was issued on 4 September 1981 with his portrait on the face.
