= Jones' stain =

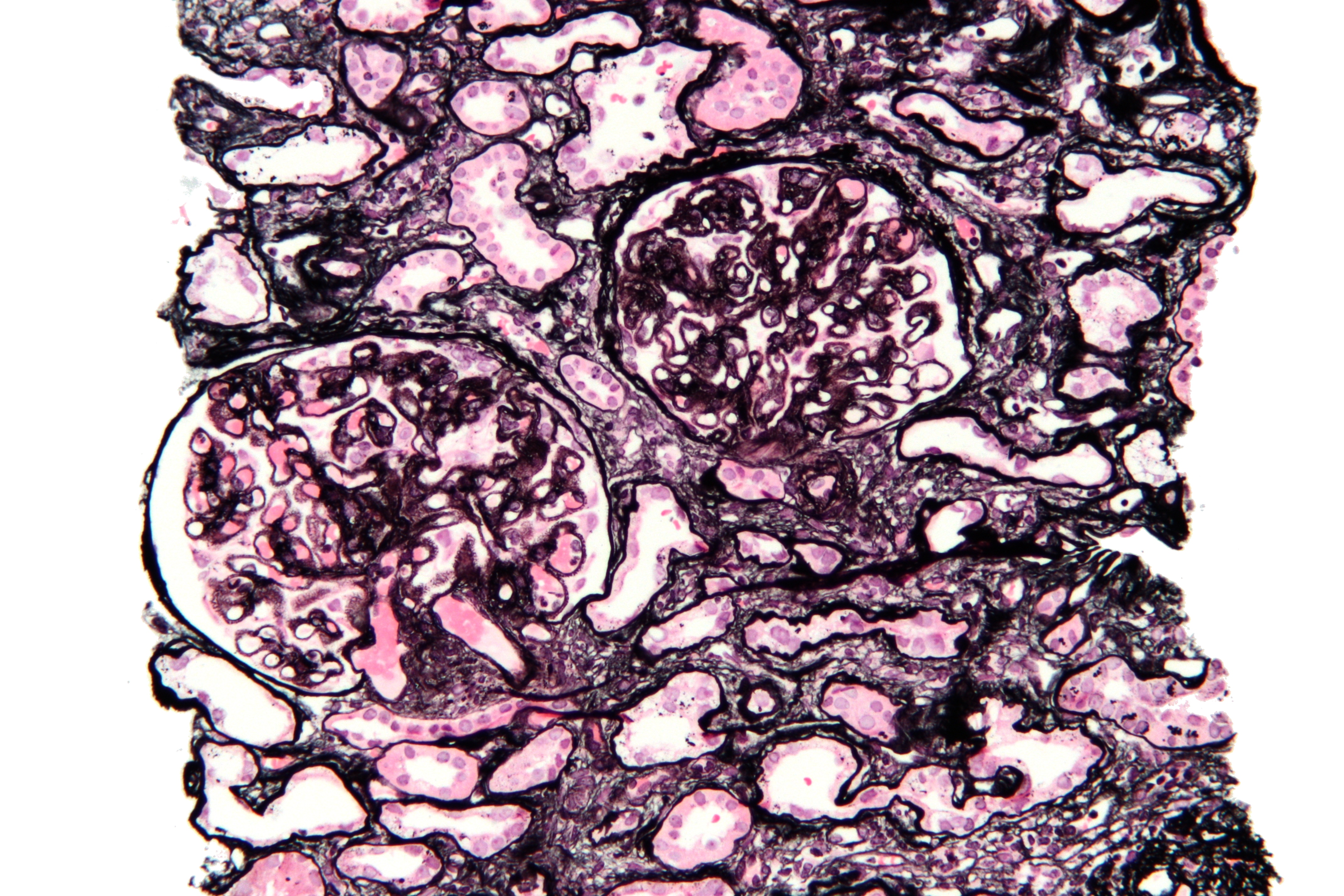
Micrograph of a kidney biopsy stained with a Jones stain.

Jones' stain, also Jones stain, is a methenamine silver–periodic acid–Schiff stain used in pathology. It is also referred to as methenamine PAS which is commonly abbreviated MPAS.

It stains for basement membrane and is widely used in the investigation of medical kidney diseases.

The Jones stain demonstrates the spiked GBM, caused by subepithelial deposits, seen in membranous nephropathy.

== See also ==
- Staining
