= Osmotic nephrosis =

Structural changes at cellular level in the human kidney

Osmotic nephrosis refers to structural changes that occur at the cellular level in the human kidney. Cells, primarily of the straight proximal tubule, swell due to the formation of large vacuoles in the cytoplasm. These vacuoles occur in the presence of large amounts of certain solutes circulating in the tubules. However, despite the condition's name, the solutes do not cause change through osmotic forces but through pinocytosis. Once inside the cytoplasm, pinocytic vacuoles combine with each other and with lysosomes to form large vacuoles that appear transparent under microscopic examination.

There may be no symptomatic presentation with this condition, or it may confused with other nephrotic conditions such as Tubular calcineurin-inhibitor toxicity. Affected cells of the proximal tubule may be passed in the urine, but a kidney biopsy is the only sure way to make a diagnosis.

Responsible exogenous solutes include sucrose-containing IVIg, mannitol, dextran, contrast dye, and hydroxyethyl starch. Prevention includes standard preventions for iatrogenic kidney damage. Osmotic nephrosis is usually reversible but can lead to chronic kidney failure.
