= Urostealith =

Fatty or resinous substance composing bladder stones

Urostealith is a fatty or resinous substance identified by the Austrian chemist J. F. Heller in 1845 as the main constituent of some bladder stones.

According to Heller's and other contemporary descriptions, urostealith is a soft brown substance, insoluble in water, sparingly soluble in alcohol and easily soluble in ether. Upon heating it softens at first, then expands and carbonizes before melting. It dissolves in solutions of sodium carbonate, and the latter was successfully used by Heller to dissolve and break up stones in a patient's bladder.

Urostealith stones seem to be very rare. The circumstances that lead to their formation, as well as the composition of the substance, are still obscure, and little has been published on the topic.

== See also ==
- Lipiduria
