= Nephrosis =

Non-inflammatory kidney disease

- Specialty: Nephrology

Nephrosis is any of various forms of kidney disease (nephropathy). In an old and broad sense of the term, it is any nephropathy, but in current usage the term is usually restricted to a narrower sense of nephropathy without inflammation or neoplasia, in which sense it is distinguished from nephritis, which involves inflammation. It is also defined as any purely degenerative disease of the renal tubules. Nephrosis is characterized by a set of signs called the nephrotic syndrome. Nephrosis can be a primary disorder or can be secondary to another disorder. Nephrotic complications of another disorder can coexist with nephritic complications. In other words, nephrosis and nephritis can be pathophysiologically contradistinguished, but that does not mean that they cannot occur simultaneously. Types of nephrosis include amyloid nephrosis and osmotic nephrosis.

== Epidemiology ==
Disability-adjusted life year for nephritis and nephrosis per 100,000 inhabitants in 2004. no data less than 40 40-120 120-200 200-280 280-360 360-440 440-520 520-600 600-680 680-760 760-840 more than 840
