= Heller's test =

Chemical test

Heller's test is a chemical test that shows that strong acids cause the denaturation of precipitated proteins. Concentrated nitric acid is added to a protein solution from the side of the test tube to form two layers. A white ring appears between the two layers if the test is positive. Heller's test is commonly used to test for the presence of proteins in urine. This test was discovered by the Austrian Chemist, Johann Florian Heller (1813-1871).
