= Membranoproliferative glomerulonephritis =

- Other names: Mesangiocapillary glomerulonephritis
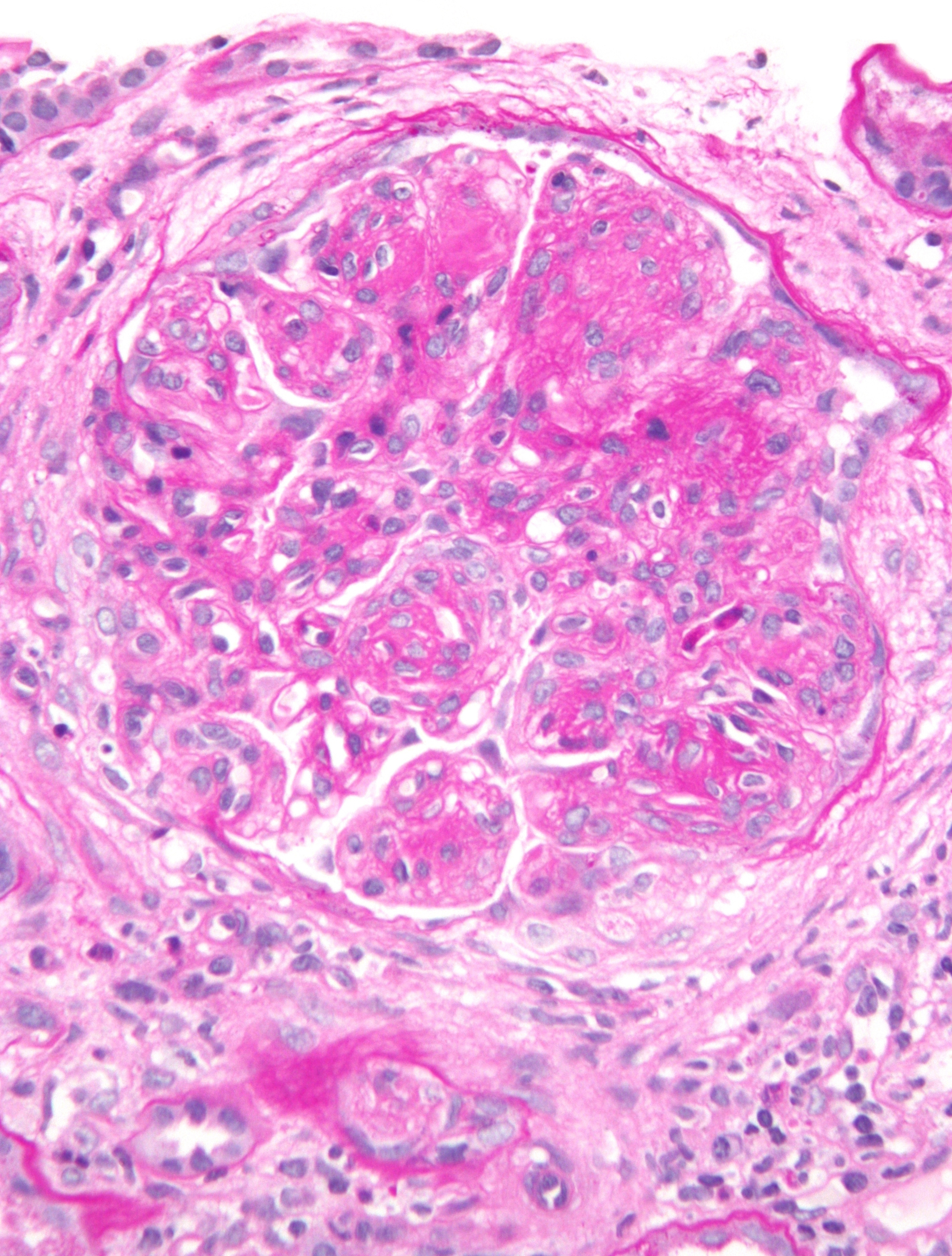
- Micrograph of glomerulus in membranoproliferative glomerulonephritis with increased mesangial matrix and increased mesangial cellularity. Kidney biopsy. PAS stain.
- Specialty: Nephrology

Membranoproliferative glomerulonephritis (MPGN) is a type of glomerulonephritis caused by deposits in the kidney glomerular mesangium and basement membrane (GBM) thickening, activating the complement system and damaging the glomeruli.

MPGN accounts for approximately 4% of primary renal causes of nephrotic syndrome in children and 7% in adults.

It should not be confused with membranous glomerulonephritis, a condition in which the basement membrane is thickened, but the mesangium is not.

== Type ==
There are three types of MPGN, but this classification is becoming obsolete as the causes of this pattern are becoming understood.

=== Type I ===
Type I, the most common by far, is caused by immune complexes depositing in the kidney. It is characterised by subendothelial and mesangial immune deposits.

It is believed to be associated with the classical complement pathway.

=== Type II – Dense deposit disease ===
Type II is today more commonly known as dense deposit disease (DDD). Most cases of dense deposit disease do not show a membranoproliferative pattern. It forms a continuum with C3 glomerulonephritis; together they make up the two major subgroups of C3 glomerulopathy.

Most cases are associated with the dysregulation of the alternative complement pathway.

DDD is associated with deposition of complement C3 within the glomeruli with little or no staining for immunoglobulin. The presence of C3 without significant immunoglobulin suggested to early investigators that DDD was due to abnormal activation of the complement alternative pathway (AP). There is now strong evidence that DDD is caused by uncontrolled AP activation.

Spontaneous remissions of MPGN II are rare; approximately half of those affected with MPGN II will progress to end stage renal disease within ten years.

In many cases, people with MPGN II can develop drusen caused by deposits within Bruch's membrane beneath the retinal pigment epithelium of the eye. Over time, vision can deteriorate, and subretinal neovascular membranes, macular detachment, and central serous retinopathy can develop.

=== Type III ===
Type III is very rare, it is characterized by a mixture of subepithelial and subendothelial immune and/or complement deposits. These deposits elicit an immune response, causing damage to cells and structures within their vicinity. Has similar pathological findings of Type I disease.

A candidate gene has been identified on chromosome 1.

Complement component 3 is seen under immunofluorescence. it is associated with complement receptor 6 deficiency.

== Pathology ==
Renal corpuscle. Membranoproliferative glomerulonephritis involves deposits at the intraglomerular mesangium which leads to "splitting" of the glomerular basement membrane.

Membranoproliferative glomerulonephritis involves deposits at the intraglomerular mesangium.

It is also the main hepatitis C associated nephropathy.

It also is related to a number of autoimmune diseases, prominently systemic lupus erythematosus (SLE), Class IV. Also found with Sjögren syndrome, rheumatoid arthritis, inherited complement deficiencies (esp C3 deficiency), scleroderma, Celiac disease.

The histomorphologic differential diagnosis includes transplant glomerulopathy and thrombotic microangiopathies.

== Diagnosis ==
The GBM is rebuilt on top of the deposits, causing a "tram tracking" appearance under the microscope. Mesangial cellularity is increased.

== Treatment ==
Primary MPGN is treated with steroids, plasma exchange and other immunosuppressive drugs. Secondary MPGN is treated by treating the associated infection, autoimmune disease or neoplasms. Pegylated interferon and ribavirin are useful in reducing viral load.

== See also ==
- Diffuse proliferative nephritis
