= Minimal change disease =

Kidney disease causing nephrotic syndrome

- The three hallmarks of minimal change disease (seen on electron microscopy): diffuse loss of podocyte foot processes, vacuolation, and the appearance of microvilli.
- Specialty: Nephrology

Minimal change disease (MCD), also known as lipoid nephrosis or nil disease, among others, is a disease affecting the kidneys which causes nephrotic syndrome. Nephrotic syndrome leads to the loss of significant amounts of protein to the urine (proteinuria), which causes the widespread edema (soft tissue swelling) and impaired kidney function commonly experienced by those affected by the disease. It is most common in children and has a peak incidence at 2 to 6 years of age. MCD is responsible for 10–25% of nephrotic syndrome cases in adults. It is also the most common cause of nephrotic syndrome of unclear cause (idiopathic) in children.

== Signs and symptoms ==
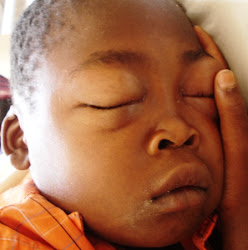
Periorbital edema that can be seen in minimal change disease

The clinical signs of minimal change disease are proteinuria (abnormal excretion of proteins, mainly albumin, into the urine), edema (swelling of soft tissues as a consequence of water retention), weight gain, and hypoalbuminemia (low serum albumin). These signs are referred to collectively as nephrotic syndrome.

The first clinical sign of minimal change disease is usually edema with an associated increase in weight. The swelling may be mild but patients can present with edema in the lower half of the body, periorbital edema, swelling in the scrotal/labial area and anasarca in more severe cases. In older adults, patients may also present with acute kidney injury (20–25% of affected adults) and high blood pressure. Due to the disease process, patients with minimal change disease are also at risk of blood clots and infections.

== Pathology ==
For years, pathologists found no changes when viewing kidney biopsy specimens under light microscopy, hence the name "minimal change disease". While mesangial expansion may be seen in some cases, there are no other pathognomonic injuries to the glomerulus itself.

Under immunofluorescence, there are no immunoglobulins or complement deposits bound to kidney tissue.

With the advent of electron microscopy, the changes now known as the hallmarks of the disease were discovered. These are diffuse loss of visceral epithelial cells' foot processes (i.e., podocyte effacement), vacuolation, and growth of microvilli on the visceral epithelial cells, allowing for excess protein loss in the urine.

== Pathophysiology ==
=== Proteinuria ===
The cause and pathogenesis of minimal change disease is unclear and it is currently considered idiopathic. However, it does not appear to involve complement or immune complex deposition. Rather, an altered T cell-mediated immunologic response with abnormal secretion of lymphokines by T cells is thought to modify the glomerular basement membrane, specifically the podocytes, increasing permeability. This allows the leakage of albumin and other serum proteins into the urine. Also, the exact cytokine responsible has yet to be elucidated, with IL-12, IL-18 and IL-13 having been most studied in this regard, yet never conclusively implicated. Data from a longitudinal study (Nephrotic Syndrome Study Network – NEPTUNE) published in 2022 suggested that up to 29% of biopsy-confirmed, mixed pediatric and adult minimal change disease cases exhibited serum autoantibodies against nephrin, a structural protein located in the podocyte slit diaphragm. An additional multi-center study published in 2024 confirmed the presence of nephrin autoantibodies in 44% of adults and 52% of children with minimal change disease. In this study, autoantibody level correlated with disease activity, with up to 90% of patients not receiving immunosuppressive therapy testing positive for nephrin antibodies.

There has been discussion of B cell involvement in nephrotic syndrome, especially minimal change disease due to the success of immunotherapy that target both B and T cells, increased markers for B cell activation during a relapse of minimal change disease, and alterations in B cell sub-classes during minimal change disease remission. This hypothesis is supported by recent findings of anti-nephrin antibodies isolated in minimal change disease.

=== Edema ===
When albumin is excreted in the urine, its serum (blood) concentration decreases. Consequently, the plasma oncotic pressure reduces relative to the interstitial tissue. The subsequent movement of fluid from the vascular compartment to the interstitial compartment manifests as the soft tissue swelling referred to as edema. This fluid collects most commonly in the feet and legs, in response to gravity, particularly in those with poorly functioning valves. In severe cases, fluid can shift into the peritoneal cavity (abdomen) and cause ascites. As a result of the excess fluid, individuals with minimal change disease often gain weight, as they are excreting less water in the urine, and experience fatigue.

== Diagnosis ==
As minimal change disease is a subset of nephrotic syndrome, diagnosis involves looking for a combination of edema, high amounts of protein in urine, low albumin and high serum cholesterol. Initial workup can include a urinalysis, kidney function tests, serum albumin level and a lipid panel. Microscopic amounts of blood are present in the urine of 10–30% adults with MCD.

As MCD is the most common type of nephrotic syndrome in children, renal biopsy is not usually done in children under the age of 10 unless there are concerning features that are unusual for the disease (high blood pressure, bloody urine, renal dysfunction) and if they fail to respond to corticosteroid therapy. These would suggest that it may not be minimal change disease. In adults, a renal biopsy is required as there is a much wider differential for nephrotic syndrome. As the name suggests, the renal biopsy of a patient with minimal change disease would show minimal or no evidence of disease in light microscopy, which is unique among the causes of nephrotic syndrome.

== Treatment ==
=== Children ===
The first line therapy for minimal change disease is prednisone, a corticosteroid, 60 mg/sq.m/day or 2 mg/kg/day. For those children who are unable to tolerate corticosteroid treatment, or are unresponsive (usually after a trial of 8 weeks), another immunosuppressant cyclosporin is an alternative; other immunosuppressants have also been used such as a calcineurin inhibitor, mycophenolate mofetil, and rituximab though studies on their effectiveness are fairly limited. There is no consensus on how long the corticosteroid therapy should be, with treatment length ranging from 4–12 weeks. Along with corticosteroid therapy, acute symptomatic management involves salt and fluid restriction to control the swelling.

=== Adults ===
Treatment guidelines for adults are fairly limited, and are largely based on studies done on children. The mainline therapy is also corticosteroid therapy prednisone 1 mg/kg/day with other immunosuppressants as possible alternatives, though there is very little data on these alternatives' efficacy. Rituximab has recently shown efficacy in treating steroid-dependent and steroid-resistant nephrotic syndrome in adults, although more studies need to be conducted to determine long-term efficacy of this treatment. Other medications such as ACE inhibitors to reduce the amount of protein in the urine or statins to decrease high levels of cholesterol seen with nephrotic syndrome are generally unnecessary. ACE inhibitors may be considered in people with MCD who also have high blood pressure.

== Prognosis ==
=== Children ===
Minimal change disease usually responds well to initial treatment with the first-line therapy: corticosteroids, with 95% responding. Younger children, who are more likely to develop minimal change disease, usually respond faster than adults with 50% of children having complete remission with 8 days of corticosteroid therapy and most other patients responding by the 4th week. Few do not respond to corticosteroids and have to rely on an alternative therapy. However, despite positive response to corticosteroids, relapses are common, requiring repeat treatment with corticosteroids. About 25% never relapse, another 25% relapse infrequently (one relapse within 6 months of initial response or 1–3 relapses in 12 months), and 50% relapse frequently (>2 relapses within 6 months of initial response or >4 relapses in 12 months). The relapse rate is the reason behind a discussion on continuing prednisone treatment to even beyond 12 weeks to possibly decrease relapse rate; several studies trying this have failed to show significant improvement. A majority of relapses seem to be triggered by respiratory infections. Long term, children can relapse several years after having no symptoms; though after 2 years, the risk is significantly lower.

In most children with minimal change disease, particularly among those who respond typically, there is minimal to no permanent damage observed in their kidneys. Complications primarily arise from the side effects of therapy. Prolonged use of corticosteroids can lead to immunosuppression (leading to infection), growth complications, and weight gain.

=== Adults ===
While most adults diagnosed with minimal change disease respond to corticosteroids, 25% fail to respond after 3–4 months of corticosteroid therapy; it is possible that these patients were incorrectly diagnosed, and do not have minimal change disease. Adults with MCD tend to respond more slowly to corticosteroid treatment, taking up to 3 or 4 months, than children do. Data in adults is less complete than for children, but relapses are fairly frequent with 56–76% of patients relapsing and needing further treatment with immunosuppressants such as ciclosporin, tacrolimus, mycophenolate, and rituximab. There is little evidence to support the use of azathioprine for MCD. Complications primarily arise from the side effects of therapy.

== Epidemiology ==
Minimal change disease is most common in very young children but can occur in older children and adults.

It is by far the most common cause of nephrotic syndrome in children, accounting for 70–90% of children >1 year of age. After puberty, it is caused by minimal change disease about half the time. Among young children, boys seem to be more likely to develop minimal change disease than girls (about 2:1). Minimal change disease is seen in about 16 in every 100,000 children, being more common in South Asians and Native Americans, but rarer in African Americans.

In adults, it accounts for less than 15% of adults diagnosed with nephrotic syndrome.

== Other names for the disease ==
Minimal change disease has been called by many other names in the medical literature, including minimal change nephropathy, minimal change nephrosis, minimal change nephrotic syndrome, minimal change glomerulopathy, foot process disease (referring to the podocyte foot processes, nil disease (referring to the lack of pathologic findings on light microscopy), nil lesions, lipid nephrosis, and lipoid nephrosis.
