= Focal segmental glomerulosclerosis =

Kidney disease

- Other names: focal glomerular sclerosis, focal nodular glomerulosclerosis
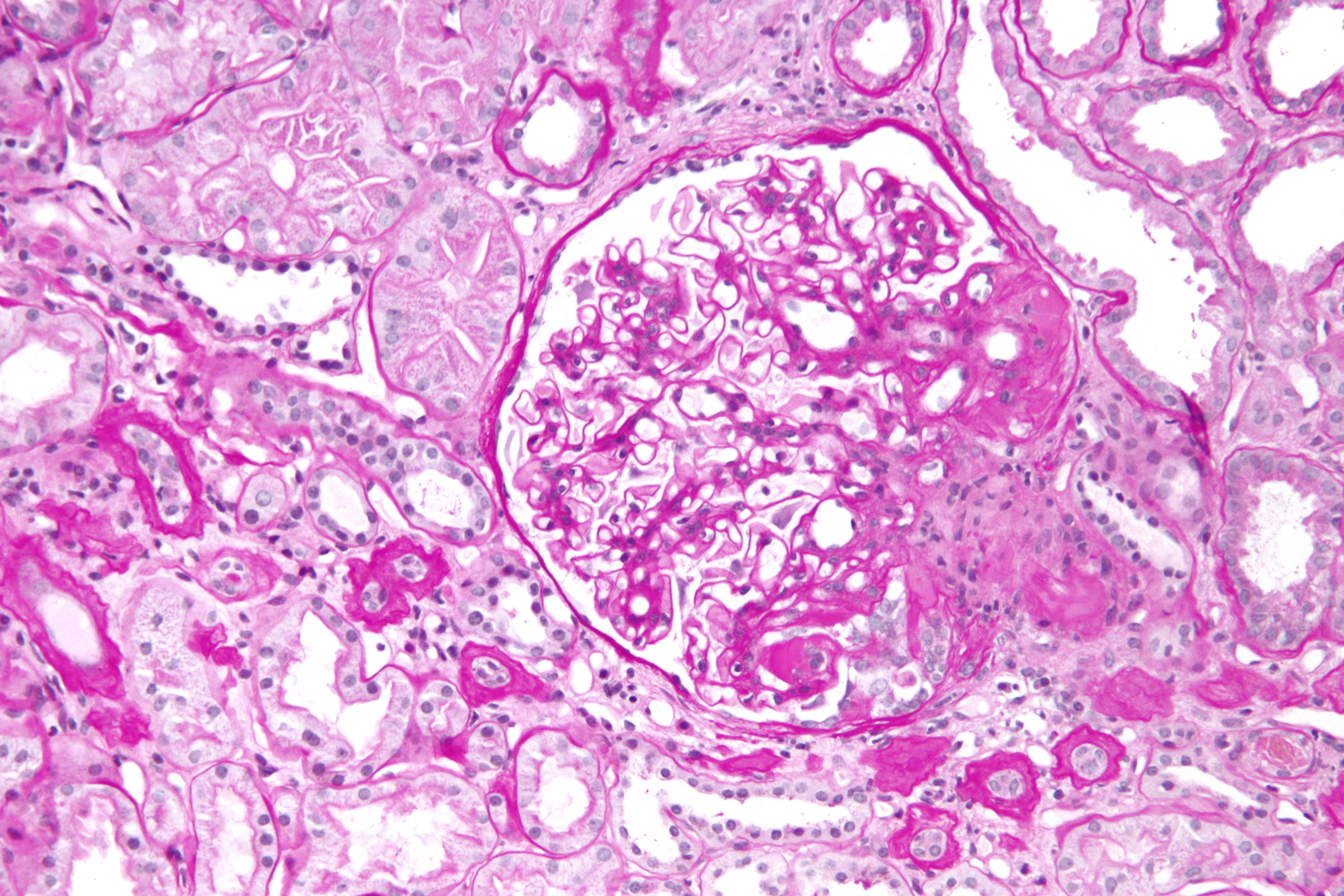
- Light micrograph of focal segmental glomerulosclerosis, hilar variant. Kidney biopsy. PAS stain.
- Specialty: Nephrology

Focal segmental glomerulosclerosis (FSGS) is a histopathologic finding of scarring (sclerosis) of glomeruli and damage to renal podocytes. This process damages the filtration function of the kidney, resulting in protein presence in the urine due to protein loss. FSGS is a leading cause of excess protein loss—nephrotic syndrome—in children and adults in the US. Signs and symptoms include proteinuria and edema. Kidney failure is a common long-term complication of the disease. FSGS can be classified as primary, secondary, or genetic, depending on whether a particular toxic or pathologic stressor or genetic predisposition can be identified as the cause. Diagnosis is established by renal biopsy, and treatment consists of glucocorticoids and other immune-modulatory drugs. Response to therapy is variable, with a significant portion of patients progressing to end-stage kidney failure. An American epidemiological study 20 years ago demonstrated that FSGS is estimated to occur in 7 persons per million, with male African-Americans at higher risk.

== Signs and symptoms ==
The most common symptoms are a result of abnormal loss of protein from the glomerulus of the kidney, and include:

- Frothy urine (due to excess protein)
- Excess water retention (pitting edema, due to loss of serum albumin)
- Susceptibility to infection (due to loss of serum antibodies)

Common signs are also due to loss of blood proteins by the glomerulus of the kidney, including:

- Protein in the urine (often in the nephrotic syndrome-range of >3.5 g/day)
- Low serum albumin (<3.5 g/dl)
- Low serum antibodies
- High serum cholesterol (compensatory by the liver to compensate for low serum oncotic pressure)
- Fatty casts in the urine (secondary to hypercholesterolemia)

== Pathophysiology ==
The renal glomerulus consists of a set of capillaries from which blood is filtered into Bowman's space. Large molecules, such as proteins, are usually too large to be filtered and instead are retained in the capillaries.

FSGS is primarily a disease of the renal glomerulus, the site of filtration of ions and solutes. Podocytes are specialized cells lining the Bowman's capsule that contribute to the filtration barrier, preventing molecules larger than 5 nm from being filtered. FSGS involves damage to the renal podocytes such that larger molecules, most notably proteins, are filtered and lost through the kidney. Thus, many of the signs and symptoms of FSGS are related to protein loss.

On histology, FSGS manifests as scarring (sclerosis) to segments of glomeruli; moreover, only a portion of glomeruli are affected. The focal and segmental nature of disease seen on histology helps to distinguish FSGS from other types of glomerular sclerosis.

The putative cause of podocyte damage helps to classify FSGS. Primary FSGS involves cases in which no cause is readily identifiable. It is presumed that a set of unidentified circulating factors in the blood contribute to podocyte damage in these cases.

Secondary FSGS is caused by an identifiable stress or toxin that injures podocytes. Many causes of secondary FSGS contribute to podocyte injury through hyperfiltration, which is a scenario of excess filtration by renal glomeruli. Hyperfiltration can be caused by obesity, diabetes or loss of the contralateral kidney, among other causes.

Toxins, including anabolic steroids and heroin, can cause secondary FSGS.

Several genes have been implicated in FSGS. These include: NPHS1, which encodes the protein nephrin that contributes to the filtration barrier; NPHS2, which encodes the protein podocin found in podocytes; and INF2, which encodes the actin-binding protein formin.

The pathogenesis of HIV-associated FSGS is unclear, but may be due to the presence of the G1/G2 risk alleles of the APOL1 gene. There is some data to suggest that HIV can infect tubular epithelial cells and podocytes, but much remains to be known.

Gain of function mutations in APOL1 have also been proposed to play a role in the pathogenesis of this disease.

== Diagnosis ==
Diagnosis of FSGS is made by renal biopsy that includes at least fifteen serial cuts with at least eight glomeruli. Histologic features include sclerosis (scarring) of a portion (average: 15%) of the glomerular space, with only a portion of glomeruli manifesting any sclerosis.

Other tests helpful in the diagnosis include urine protein, urinalysis, serum albumin, and serum lipids. A clinical picture of proteinuria, low blood protein levels (albumin, antibodies), and high blood cholesterol would support a diagnosis of FSGS. These do not help distinguish between FSGS and other causes of proteinuria.

=== Classification ===
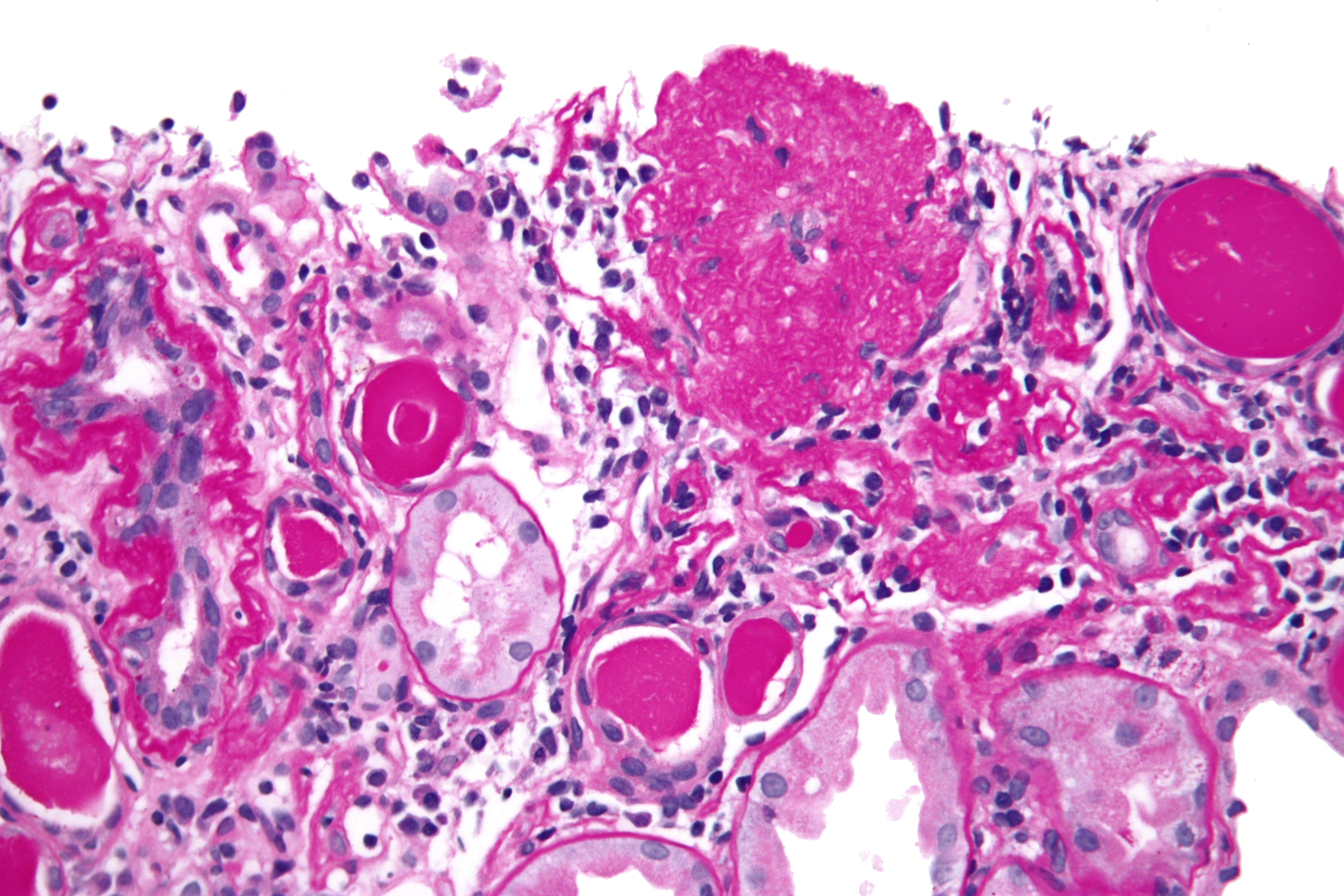
Micrograph of the collapsing variant of FSGS (collapsing glomerulopathy). A collapsed glomerulus is seen at the top, right-of-centre. PAS stain. Kidney biopsy.

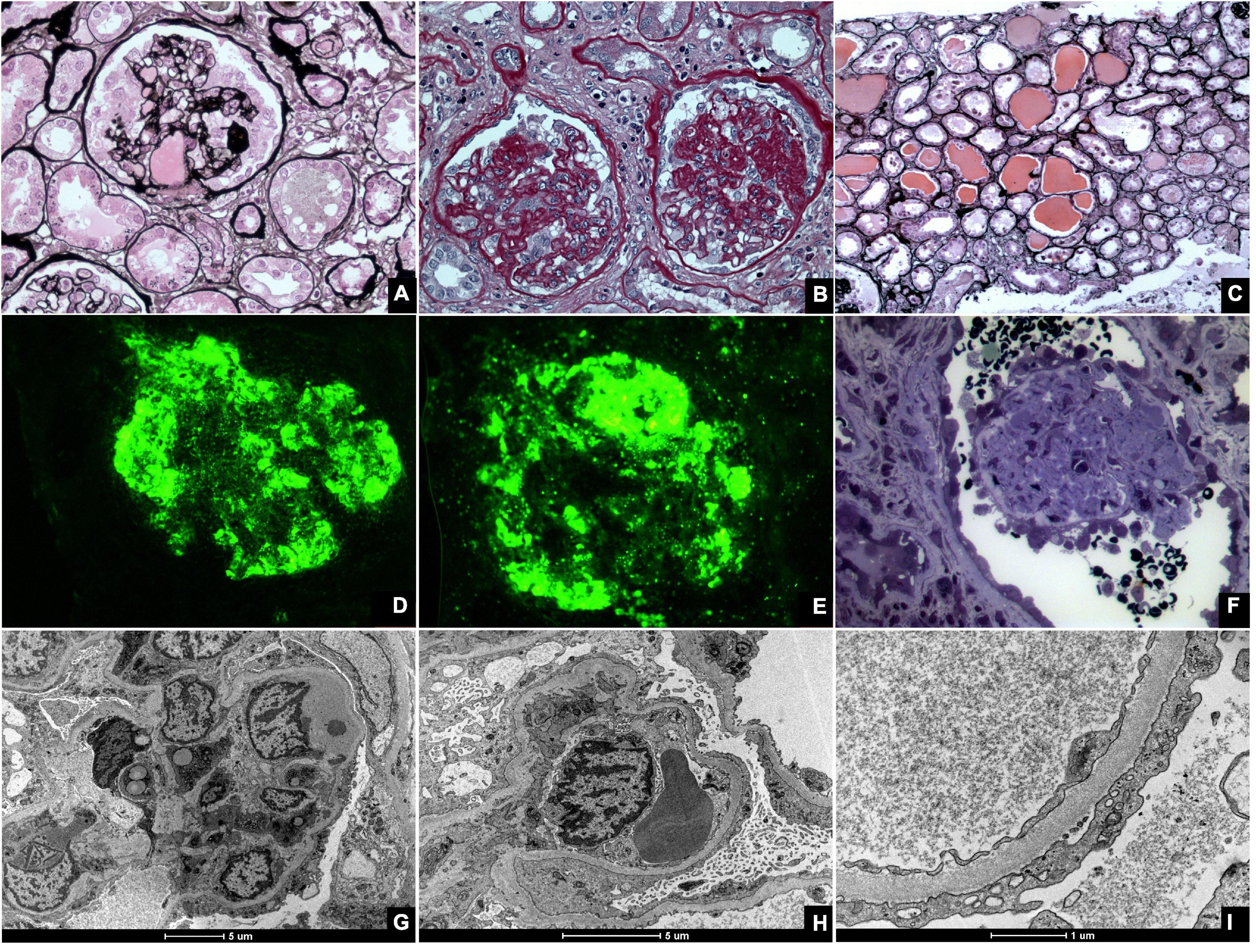
Histopathology of collapsing glomerulopathy. (A, B) Periodic Acid Schiff (PAS) and Jones Methenamine Silver (JMS) (40×), respectively, show intense podocyte hyperplasia and glomerular tuft collapse. (C) JMS (20×) exhibits microcytic transformation of distal convoluted tubules with accumulations of hyaline material inside them. (D, E) Fluorescence microscopy (40×) shows, respectively, IgM and C3 trapping in areas of collapse/sclerosis. (F) Semi-fine stained in Toluidine Blue (63×) with collapse of the entire glomerular tuft and hyperplasia of podocytes and dilated Bowman's space. (G, H) Transmission electron microscopy contrasted with Osmium Tetroxide, Lead Citrate, and Uranyl in block shows capillary loop collapse with hyalinosis in addition to diffuse fusion and flattening of the pedicels associated with microvillous transformation. (I) Electron microscopy tubes contrasted with osmium tetroxide, lead citrate, and uranyl in a block with detail of disorganization of the cytoskeleton in the podocyte cytoplasm, with extensive effacement of the pedicels.

Five mutually exclusive variants of focal segmental glomerulosclerosis may be distinguished by the pathologic findings seen on renal biopsy:

1. Collapsing variant
2. Glomerular tip lesion variant
3. Cellular variant
4. Perihilar variant
5. Not otherwise specified (NOS) variant

Recognition of these variants may have prognostic value in individuals with primary focal segmental glomerulosclerosis. The collapsing variant is associated with higher rate of progression to end-stage renal disease, whereas the glomerular tip lesion variant has a low rate of progression to end-stage renal disease in most patients. The cellular variant shows similar clinical presentation to collapsing and glomerular tip variant but has intermediate outcomes between the other two variants.

== Treatment ==
First-line treatment for primary FSGS consists of anti-inflammatory drugs. Specifically, glucocorticoids are begun in patients manifesting with nephrotic-range proteinuria (>3.5 g/day). For patients who maintain nephrotic-range proteinuria despite glucocorticoids, or for patients who demonstrate glucocorticoid intolerance, calcineurin inhibitors (e.g., tacrolimus) are initiated. Successful treatment is defined as a drop in proteinuria to sub-nephrotic ranges.

The treatment of secondary FSGS involves addressing the particular toxic or stress agent.

== Prognosis ==
The majority of untreated cases of FSGS will progress to end-stage kidney disease. Important prognostic factors include the degree of proteinuria and initial response to therapy.

Patients with nephrotic-range (>3.5 g/day) proteinuria have over a 50% rate of progression to end-stage kidney disease at 10 years. Only 15% of patients with sub-nephrotic ranges of proteinuria progress to end-stage renal failure at 10 years.

Initial response to therapy also dictates long-term outcomes. Those defined as having a "complete response" typically manifest a proteinuria of <300 mg/day; those with a "partial response" manifest a subnephrotic range of proteinuria, <3.5 g/day. Either complete or partial response is associated with 80% kidney survival at 10 years, compared with about 50% among non-responsive patients.

== Epidemiology ==
FSGS accounts for 35% of all cases of nephrotic syndrome, making it one of the most common causes of nephrotic syndrome in the United States. FSGS accounts for 2% of all cases of kidney failure. African American patients have four times the likelihood of developing FSGS. Men are about two times as likely to develop FSGS compared to women.

== Notable cases ==
- Andy Cole
- Gary Coleman
- Sean Elliott
- Alonzo Mourning

== See also ==
- Glomerulonephritis
- Nephrotic syndrome
