= Stomach disease =

Stomach diseases
- Other names: Gastropathy
- The location of the stomach in the body.
- Specialty: Gastroenterology, general surgery

Stomach diseases include gastritis, gastroparesis, Crohn's disease (rarely), and various cancers.

The stomach is an important organ in the body. It plays a vital role in digestion of foods, releases various enzymes and also protects the lower intestine from harmful organisms. The stomach connects to the esophagus above and to the small intestine below. It is intricately related to the pancreas, spleen and liver. The stomach does vary in size but its J shape is constant. The stomach lies in the upper part of the abdomen just below the left rib cage.

The term gastropathy means "stomach disease" and is included in the name of the diseases portal hypertensive gastropathy, hyperplastic hypersecretory gastropathy (Ménétrier's disease), and others. However, not all stomach diseases are labeled with the word "gastropathy"; examples include peptic ulcer disease, gastroparesis, and dyspepsia.

Many stomach diseases are associated with infections. In the past it was widely but incorrectly believed that the highly acidic environment of the stomach would keep the stomach immune from infection. Many studies have indicated that most cases of stomach ulcers, gastritis, and stomach cancer are caused by Helicobacter pylori infection. One of the ways it is able to survive in the stomach involves its urease enzymes which metabolize urea (which is normally secreted into the stomach) to ammonia and carbon dioxide which neutralises gastric acid and thus prevents its digestion. In recent years, it has been discovered that other Helicobacter bacteria are also capable of colonising the stomach and have been associated with gastritis.

Having too little or no gastric acid is known as hypochlorhydria or achlorhydria respectively and are conditions which can have negative health impacts. Having high levels of gastric acid is called hyperchlorhydria. Many people believe that hyperchlorhydria can cause stomach ulcers. However, recent research indicates that the gastric mucosa which secretes gastric acid is acid-resistant.

There are many types of chronic disorders which affect the stomach. However, since the symptoms are localized to this organ, the typical symptoms of stomach problems include nausea, vomiting, bloating, cramps, diarrhea and pain.

== Gastritis ==
In the stomach there is a slight balance between acid and the wall lining which is protected by mucus. When this mucus lining is disrupted for whatever reason, signs and symptoms of acidity result. This may result in upper abdominal pain, indigestion, loss of appetite, nausea, vomiting and heartburn. When the condition is allowed to progress, the pain may become continuous; blood may start to leak and be seen in the stools. If the bleeding is rapid and of adequate volume it may even result in vomiting of bright red blood (hematemesis). When the acidity is uncontrolled, it can even cause severe blood loss (anemia) or lead to perforation (hole) in the stomach which is a surgical emergency. In many individuals, the progressive bleeding from an ulcer mixes with the feces and presents as black stools. Presence of blood in stools is often the first sign that there is a problem in the stomach.

== Gastroparesis ==
Another very common long-term problem which is now more appreciated is gastroparesis. Gastroparesis affects millions of individuals and is often never suspected and most patients have a delay in diagnosis. In gastroparesis, the stomach motility disappears and food remains stagnant in the stomach. The most common cause of gastroparesis is diabetes, but it can also occur from a blockage at the distal end of stomach, a cancer, or a stroke. Symptoms of gastroparesis include abdominal pain, fullness, bloating, nausea, vomiting after eating food, loss of appetite, and feeling of fullness after eating small amounts of food.

== Crohn's disease ==
Crohn's disease is an inflammatory bowel disease that can affect any part of the digestive tract, even the stomach, although it's a rare presentation. Its main feature is inflammatory ulcers that can affect the total thickness of the stomach wall and can bleed but rarely perforate. Symptoms include abdominal pain, loss of appetite, and weight loss. Diarrhea is also a symptom that can develop, so checking stools for the appearance of blood is important. It is possible for symptoms of Crohn's disease to remain with a person for weeks or go away on their own. Reporting the symptoms to a doctor is recommended to prevent further complications.

== Cancers ==
Cancers of the stomach are rare and the incidence has been declining worldwide. Stomach cancers usually occur due to fluctuations in acidity level and may present with vague symptoms of abdominal fullness, weight loss and pain. The actual cause of stomach cancer is not known but has been linked to infection with Helicobacter pylori, pernicious anemia, Menetrier's disease, and nitrogenous preservatives in food.

== Diagnosis ==
=== Endoscopy ===
There are many tools for investigating stomach problems. The most common is endoscopy. This procedure is performed as an outpatient and utilizes a small flexible camera. The procedure requires intravenous sedation and takes about 30–45 minutes; the endoscope is inserted via the mouth and can visualize the entire swallowing tube, stomach and duodenum. The procedure also allows the physician to obtain biopsy samples. In many cases of bleeding, the surgeon can use the endoscope to treat the source of bleeding with laser, clips or other injectable drugs.

=== X rays ===
Other radiological studies frequently used to assess patients with chronic stomach problems include a barium swallow, where a dye is consumed and pictures of the esophagus and stomach are obtained every few minutes. Other tests include a 24-hour pH study, CT scans or MRI etc.
