= Mucosal fold =

A mucosal fold refers to a fold in any mucous membrane in the body.

This may refer to:

- Gastric fold of the gastric mucosa
- Transverse folds of rectum in the anal canal
- Circular folds in the small intestine
