= SIGLEC8 =

Protein-coding gene in the species Homo sapiens

Identifiers
- Aliases: SIGLEC8, SAF2, SIGLEC-8, SIGLEC8L, sialic acid binding Ig like lectin 8
- External IDs: OMIM: 605639; MGI: 2681107; GeneCards: SIGLEC8
Available structures
PDB	Ortholog search: PDBe RCSB
PDB	List of PDB id codes 2N7B, 2N7A

Gene location (Human)
Chr.	Chromosome 19 (human)
Band	19q13.41	Start	51,450,847 bp
Band	19q13.41	End	51,458,456 bp

Gene location (Mouse)
Chr.	Chromosome 7 (mouse)
Band	7|7 B3	Start	43,000,765 bp
Band	7|7 B3	End	43,008,955 bp
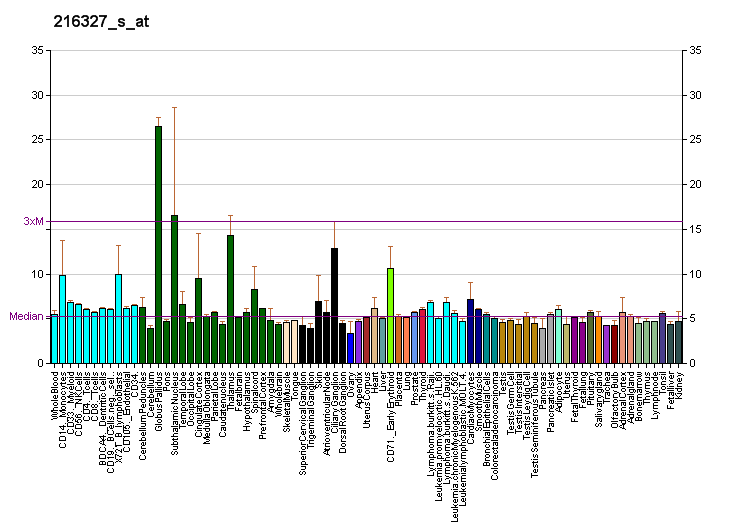

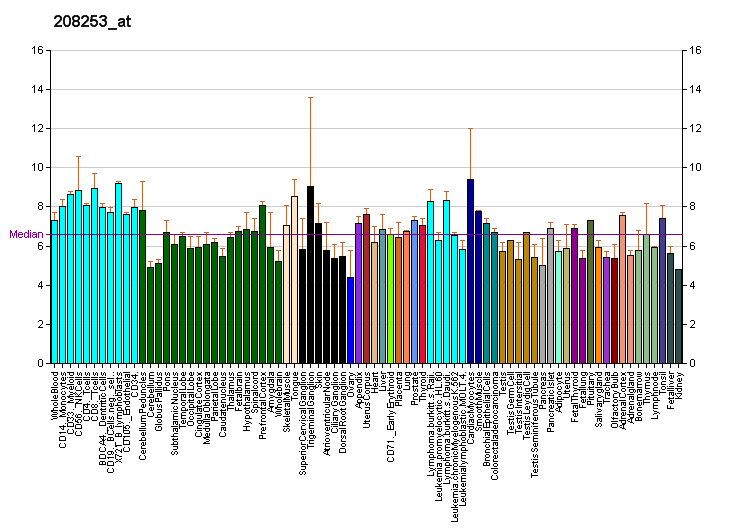

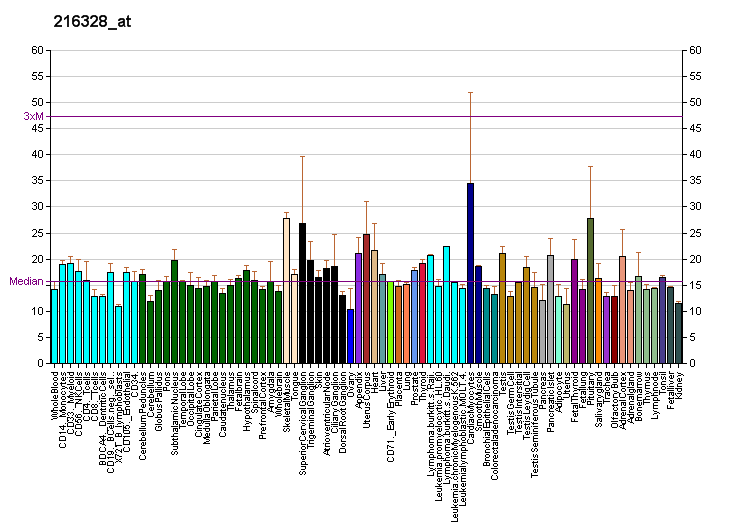
RNA expression pattern
Bgee	Human / Mouse (ortholog); Top expressed in: C1 segment; spleen; lymph node; right adrenal cortex; left adrenal gland; substantia nigra; left adrenal cortex; internal globus pallidus; prefrontal cortex; gallbladder / Top expressed in: granulocyte; right lung lobe; primary oocyte; embryo; secondary oocyte; morula; blood; zygote; bone marrow; intestinal villus; More reference expression data
BioGPS	More reference expression data
Gene ontology
Molecular function	protein binding; transmembrane signaling receptor activity; carbohydrate binding
Cellular component	integral component of membrane; membrane
Biological process	cell adhesion; signal transduction
Sources:Amigo / QuickGO
Orthologs
Databases	NCBI: entry; OMA: entry
Species	Human	Mouse
Entrez	27181	233186
Ensembl	ENSG00000105366	ENSMUSG00000039013
UniProt	Q9NYZ4	Q920G3
RefSeq (mRNA)	NM_014442; NM_001363548	NM_001271019; NM_145581
RefSeq (protein)	NP_055257; NP_001350477	NP_001257948; NP_663556
Location (UCSC)	Chr 19: 51.45 – 51.46 Mb	Chr 7: 43 – 43.01 Mb
PubMed search
- Wikidata
View/Edit Human	View/Edit Mouse

Sialic acid-binding Ig-like lectin 8 is a protein that in humans is encoded by the SIGLEC8 gene. This gene is located on chromosome 19q13.4, about 330 kb downstream of the SIGLEC9 gene. Within the siglec family of transmembrane proteins, Siglec-8 belongs to the CD33-related siglec subfamily, a subfamily that has undergone rapid evolution.

== Initial characterization ==
Siglec-8 was first identified by CD33 homology screening of ESTs from a cDNA library generated from a patient diagnosed with idiopathic hypereosinophilic syndrome and was originally termed SAF-2 (sialoadhesin family 2). At the tissue level, Siglec-8 mRNA was found to be most highly expressed in lung, PBMCs, spleen, and kidney.

== Expression ==
Siglec-8 is expressed by human eosinophils, mast cells, and, to a lesser extent, basophils. It has thus garnered attention as a molecule that is uniquely expressed by immune effector cells involved in asthma and allergy. In both eosinophils and mast cells, Siglec-8 is expressed late in development. Siglec-8 transcript and protein are detectable at day 12 during the in vitro differentiation of eosinophils from cord blood precursors, whereas the transcription factor GATA-1 peaks at day 2 and the secondary granule protein MBP-1 peaks at day 4 in this differentiation system. In mast cells generated from CD34+ precursors, Siglec-8 expression peaks at 4 weeks of differentiation, in parallel with FcεRIα surface expression.

Consistent with the concept that Siglec-8 is a late differentiation marker, Siglec-8 has not been detected on the surface of relatively undifferentiated eosinophilic cell lines, such as EoL-1, AML14, AML14.3D10, or K562, the basophilic leukemia cell line KU812, nor on cells such as HL60 or EoL-3 that have been differentiated towards an eosinophil-like lineage. Only low levels are detected on the human mast cell sub-line HMC-1.1; however, the HMC-1.2 cell line, which bears a second KIT mutation (D816V, in addition to the V560G mutation found in both HMC-1.1 and HMC-1.2 cells) that may induce further differentiation, expresses Siglec-8 at the cell surface. However, based on a small sampling of patients, all eosinophils from patients with chronic eosinophilic leukemia (CEL), hypereosinophilic syndrome, or chronic myeloid leukemia (CML), all basophils from patients with CEL or CML, and all bone marrow mast cells from patients with indolent systemic mastocytosis or aplastic anemia express Siglec-8, providing a potential target for these cells in the context of these hematologic malignancies.

In addition, baboon eosinophils as well as monocytes, a subset of lymphocytes, and neutrophils express on their cell surface a protein or proteins that are recognized by polyclonal human Siglec-8-specific antibody, consistent with genetic analyses indicating the existence of a Siglec-8 ortholog in this species. However, the 2C4, 2E2, and 7C9 monoclonal antibodies against human Siglec-8 were not found to bind to targets on baboon cells, indicating that these particular epitopes are not conserved.

== Structure ==
Two splice variants of Siglec-8 exist. The initially characterized form contains 431 amino acid residues in total, 47 of which comprise an uncharacteristically short cytoplasmic tail compared to most CD33-associated siglecs. Subsequently, a longer form of Siglec-8, initially termed Siglec-8L, that contains 499 amino acid residues was identified. This longer form of Siglec-8 shares the same extracellular region but includes a longer cytoplasmic tail with two tyrosine-based motifs (an immunoreceptor tyrosine-based inhibitory motif [ITIM] and an immunoreceptor tyrosine-based switch motif [ITSM]). Both forms of Siglec-8 are found in eosinophils and contain a V-set domain with lectin activity and two C2-type Ig repeat domains in the extracellular region. Given that the longer version is felt to be the normal version, the term Siglec-8 is best used to refer to the 499 amino acid version, while the 431 amino acid version is best referred to as the "short form" of Siglec-8.

== Ligand binding ==
Potential glycan ligands for Siglec-8 have been screened by glycan array. The glycan NeuAcα2–3(6-O-sulfo)Galβ1–4[Fucα1–3]GlcNAc, also known as 6′-sulfo-sialyl Lewis X, binds with high affinity to both Siglec-8 and to a mouse siglec, Siglec-F, which appears to have acquired a similar but not identical function and pattern of expression to human Siglec-8 through convergent evolution (the two siglecs are not orthologous). Rescreening on a more expanded glycan array reconfirmed this finding, but also identified a second closely related ligand in which the fucose is absent (NeuAcα2–3(6-O-sulfo)Galβ1–4GlcNAc, or 6′-sulfated sialyl N-acetyl-D-lactosamine. These interactions are quite specific; no binding could be detected between these siglecs and unsulfated sialyl Lewis X or sialyl Lewis X sulfated at carbon 6 of GlcNAc (6-sulfo-sialyl Lewis X) rather than carbon 6 of galactose as in 6′-sulfo-sialyl Lewis X. Similarly, no other siglecs bind effectively to these Siglec-8 ligands, as demonstrated by selective binding to eosinophils in human blood of a polymer decorated with 6′-sulfo-sialyl Lewis X. The natural ligand or ligands for Siglec-8 have not yet been positively identified, but ongoing studies have determined that there are sialidase-sensitive glycoprotein ligands for Siglec-F in mouse airways that require the activity of the α2,3 sialyltransferase 3 (ST3Gal-III) enzyme for their generation.

There is also evidence that Siglec-8 on eosinophils interacts with sialylated cis ligands. Treatment of human eosinophils with sialidase increases the extent to which a high-avidity glycan ligand (1-MDa polyacrylamide ribbon decorated with 6′-O-sulfo-3′-sialyl-LacNAc) binds to these cells by about 50%. Indeed, removal of α2,3-linked sialic acid from the cell surface not only enables Siglec-8 to bind ligand in trans to a greater extent (i.e., unmasks Siglec-8) but also impacts Siglec-8 function upon antibody engagement, which itself is not impeded by Siglec-8 interactions with cis ligands. The precise identities of the glycan ligands to which Siglec-8 binds in cis or the carrier molecules bearing them have not been determined.

== Signaling and function ==
=== Eosinophils ===
Consistent with the role of most siglecs and the presence of the intracellular ITIM, Siglec-8 has been found to function as an inhibitory immunoregulatory receptor. Ligation of Siglec-8 induces cell death in eosinophils, and, surprisingly, the normally pro-survival cytokines interleukin (IL)-5 and GM-CSF have been found to potentiate this cell death effect. IL-33, which activates and maintains eosinophils, also exerts a similar potentiating effect on Siglec-8-induced cell death. Inhibitor studies demonstrate that cell death induced by crosslinking Siglec-8 through the use of an anti-Siglec-8 mAb and a secondary antibody is mediated sequentially through reactive oxygen species (ROS) production, loss of mitochondrial membrane potential, and caspase activation. In the presence of IL-5, the loss of mitochondrial membrane integrity is accelerated and the secondary crosslinking antibody is no longer necessary to induce cell death. IL-5 stimulation also appears to alter the mode of cell death of eosinophils induced by Siglec-8 ligation in that cell death becomes a caspase-independent process. On IL-5-primed eosinophils, antibody ligation of Siglec-8 was found to lead to CD11b/CD18 integrin upregulation, conformational activation, and subsequent integrin-mediated adhesion. Disruption of integrin-mediated adhesion with antibodies to CD18 prevented Siglec-8-induced ROS production and cell death, indicating that β_{2} integrins act as essential mediators in the Siglec-8 ligation-induced cell death process in eosinophils. The signaling cascade leading to CD11b/CD18 integrin upregulation and conformational activation was elucidated using pharmacologic inhibition of key signaling molecules combined with analyses of cellular events leading to cell death. This signaling pathway is atypical for an ITIM-bearing siglec and involves the activities of a Src family kinase, Syk, PI3K, phospholipase C, protein kinase C, Rac1, PAK1, MEK1, and ERK1/2. The conformational activation of CD11b was dependent on the activity of Bruton's tyrosine kinase. There was no evidence supporting the involvement of protein tyrosine phosphatases typically associated with ITIM-mediated signaling pathways, such as SHP-1/2, in this pathway.

Disruption of Siglec-8 binding to α2,3-sialylated cis ligands enables Siglec-8 engagement-induced cell death in eosinophils and overcomes the need for cytokine priming (e.g. , with IL-5, GM-CSF, or IL-33) or extensive receptor cross-linking. The cell death pathway licensed by enzymatic removal of these sialylated cis ligands resembles that described in eosinophils primed with IL-5 in that it involves cell-surface upregulation of CD11b and ROS production and requires the activities of Syk, PI3K, and phospholipase C.

Concurrent stimulation of the IL-5 receptor and Siglec-8 leads to a type of cell death resembling regulated necrosis that is promoted by MEK1/ERK signaling. In this experimental system, inhibition of MEK1 does not alter ROS generation but the ROS inhibitor diphenyleneiodonium inhibits ERK1/2 phosphorylation and cell death, leading to the conclusion that the production of ROS is upstream of MEK1/ERK signaling in this pathway. However, in eosinophils that had been primed with IL-5 18–24 h prior to Siglec-8 ligation, the activities of MEK1 and ERK1/2 are necessary prior to integrin upregulation and ROS production. Cell death induced by Siglec-8 in the presence of IL-33, in contrast, is mediated primarily by a caspase-dependent pathway, and IL-33 is capable of synergizing with IL-5 in potentiating cell death induced by Siglec-8 ligation.

Siglec-8 undergoes endocytosis upon antibody ligation on eosinophils and mast cells. This process is dependent on the cytoplasmic ITIM (and not the ITSM), the activities of tyrosine kinases and protein kinase C, and actin rearrangement. Furthermore, it can be exploited to deliver toxins to human eosinophils or mast cells to selectively induce cell death when Siglec-8 ligation by itself would not be sufficient to do so (e.g., on mast cells or unprimed eosinophils).

=== Mast cells and basophils ===
Siglec-8 antibody engagement has been shown to inhibit FcεRIα-mediated Ca^{2+} flux and release of prostaglandin D2 and histamine. In experiments using the rat basophilic leukemia cell line RBL-2H3 stably transfected with Siglec-8, the inhibitory effect of Siglec-8 ligation on FcεRIα-mediated degranulation and Ca^{2+} flux was found to be dependent on the intact ITIM. In studies involving transgenic mouse Siglec-8-expressing bone marrow-derived mast cells, co-engagement of Siglec-8 and FcεRIα leads to the inhibition of proximal kinase signaling downstream of FcεRI ligation. However, the inhibitory activity of Siglec-8 extends beyond counteracting FcεRI-mediated mast cell activation in transgenic mice: monoclonal antibody engagement of Siglec-8 reduced mast cell activation, immune cell recruitment, and lung fibrosis in a cigarette smoke-induced model of chronic obstructive pulmonary disease and in a bleomycin-induced model of lung injury. Antibody engagement of Siglec-8 also impeded IL-33-driven mast cell activation and immune cell recruitment. Unlike on eosinophils, antibody engagement of Siglec-8 on human mast cells does not lead to substantial levels of cell death. However, enzymatic removal of α2,3-linked sialic acid from the cell surface promotes cell death upon Siglec-8 antibody ligation on primary human mast cells, suggesting that this pathway remains intact in mast cells but that it is restrained by the interaction of Siglec-8 with cis ligands.

There are no published data regarding the function of Siglec-8 on basophils.

== Relationships with other siglecs ==
=== CD33-related siglec subfamily ===
Due to its high level of sequence homology with CD33 (Siglec-3), Siglec-8 is grouped within the CD33-related siglec subfamily. This family is composed of a rapidly evolving group of siglecs that share 50–99% sequence identity. Most members of the subfamily also possess conserved cytoplasmic ITIM and ITIM-like sequences.

=== Mouse Siglec-F ===
While SIGLEC8 and mouse Siglecf do not appear to derive from the same ancestral gene (they are paralogous, not orthologous), they share a binding preference for 6′-sulfo-sialyl Lewis X and 6′-sulfated sialyl N-acetyl-D-lactosamine, similar but distinct patterns of cellular expression, and similar inhibitory functions. For example, Siglec-F is expressed by eosinophils, like Siglec-8, but is also expressed by alveolar macrophages and has not been detected on mouse mast cells or basophils. This functional convergence of Siglec-8 and Siglec-F has permitted in vivo studies to be performed in mouse models of eosinophil-mediated disorders that may provide information about the human system. In a chicken ovalbumin (OVA) model of allergic airway inflammation, the Siglec-F knockout mouse exhibits increased lung eosinophilia, enhanced inflammation, delayed resolution, and exacerbated peribronchial fibrosis. Antibody ligation of Siglec-F has also been shown to inhibit eosinophil-mediated intestinal inflammation and airway remodeling in OVA challenge models. The ST3Gal-III enzyme is necessary for the generation of the natural Siglec-F ligand, which remains unknown but is induced by IL-4 and IL-13 in the airway. Loss of this enzyme leads to enhanced allergic eosinophilic airway inflammation. Despite evidence that Siglec-F binds specifically to 6′-sulfo-sialyl Lewis X and 6′-sulfated sialyl N-acetyl-D-lactosamine, in which galactose is sulfated at carbon 6, mice deficient in the two known galactose 6-O-sulfotransferases, keratan sulfate galactose 6-O-sulfotransferase (KSGal6ST) and chondroitin 6-O-sulfotransferase 1 (C6ST-1), express equivalent levels of Siglec-F ligand. These models may shed some light on the regulation of human eosinophil biology by Siglec-8 and the production of natural Siglec-8 ligands in humans. Also like Siglec-8, Siglec-F ligation leads to the apoptosis of eosinophils. However, Siglec-F–induced eosinophil apoptosis is mediated by a mechanism distinct from that employed by Siglec-8, hindering direct comparisons between the mouse and human systems. Siglec-F-induced apoptosis is mediated by caspase activation in mouse eosinophils and does not involve ROS, in contrast to the mechanism reported in Siglec-8–induced apoptosis of human eosinophils. This apoptotic mechanism also does not involve Src family kinases, SHP-1, or NADPH.

== Clinical trials ==
In a randomized clinical trial, lirentelimab, a monoclonal antibody targeting SIGLEC8 has been evaluated as a treatment for eosinophilic gastritis and duodenitis.
