= Rugae =

Anatomical folds of organs

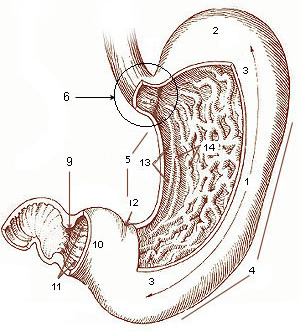
- Diagram of the stomach, with rugae labelled as 14

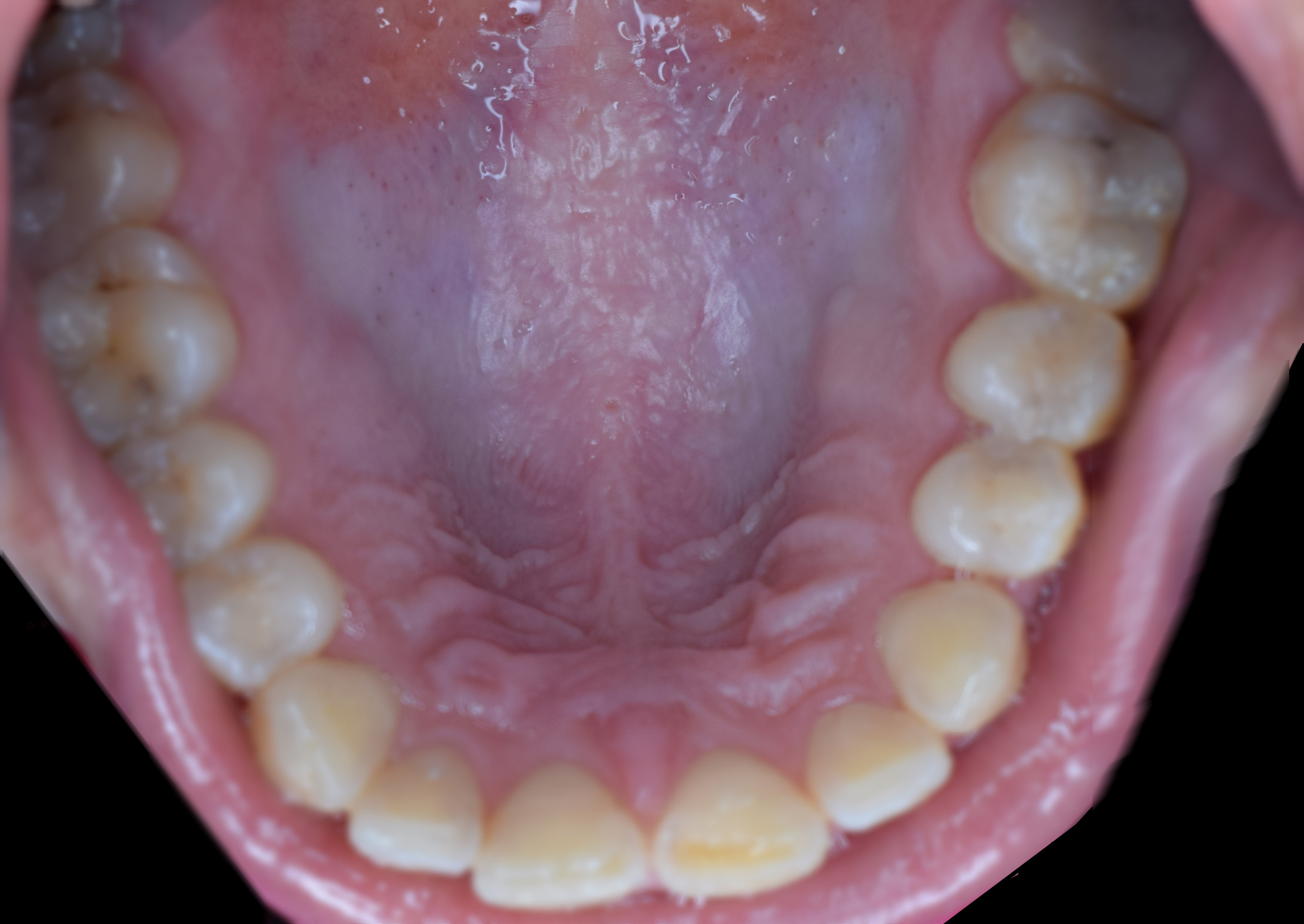
Rugae folds behind the anterior teeth in the hard palate of the mouth

In anatomy, rugae (sg.: ruga) are a series of ridges produced by folding of the wall of an organ.

In general, rugae are a biological feature found in many organisms, and serving purposes such as increasing surface-area or flexibility, or providing structural support.

Most commonly, the term rugae refers to the gastric rugae of the internal surface of the stomach.

In terrestrial gastropods, rugae often appear as fine, transverse folds or wrinkles on the mantle, back, or sides of the body. They are particularly visible when the animal extends its body or contracts, and may also be interrupted or intersected by other grooves or structures (such as dorsal grooves or keels) .

== Development ==
A study in mice has shown that palatal rugae

"develop as localized regions of epithelial proliferation and thickening prior to the elevation of the palatal shelves. Later on, the fibroblasts and collagen fibers accumulate within the connective tissue beneath the thickened epithelium and then assume a characteristic orientation. The direction of the collagen fibers running across the base of the palatine rugae determines their orientation. [...] It is believed that the role of [palatal] rugae in humans is more or less vestigial. However, in animals palatine rugae help in suckling and feeding."

== Function ==
A purpose of the gastric rugae is to allow for expansion of the stomach after the consumption of foods and liquids. This expansion increases the volume of the stomach to hold larger amounts of food. The folds also result in greater surface area, allowing the stomach to absorb nutrients more quickly.

== Location ==
Rugae can appear in the following locations in humans:

- Wrinkles of the labia and scrotum
- Hard palate immediately behind the upper anterior teeth
- Inside the urinary bladder
- Vagina
- Gallbladder
- Inside the stomach
- Inside the rectum

== Difference between rugae and plicae ==
With few exceptions (e.g. the scrotum), rugae are only evident when an organ or tissue is deflated or relaxed. For example, rugae are evident within the stomach when it is deflated. However, when the stomach distends, the rugae unfold to allow for the increase in volume. On the other hand, plicae remain folded regardless of distension as is evident within the plicae of the small intestine walls.
