= Pierre Eugène Ménétrier =

French pathologist (1859–1935)

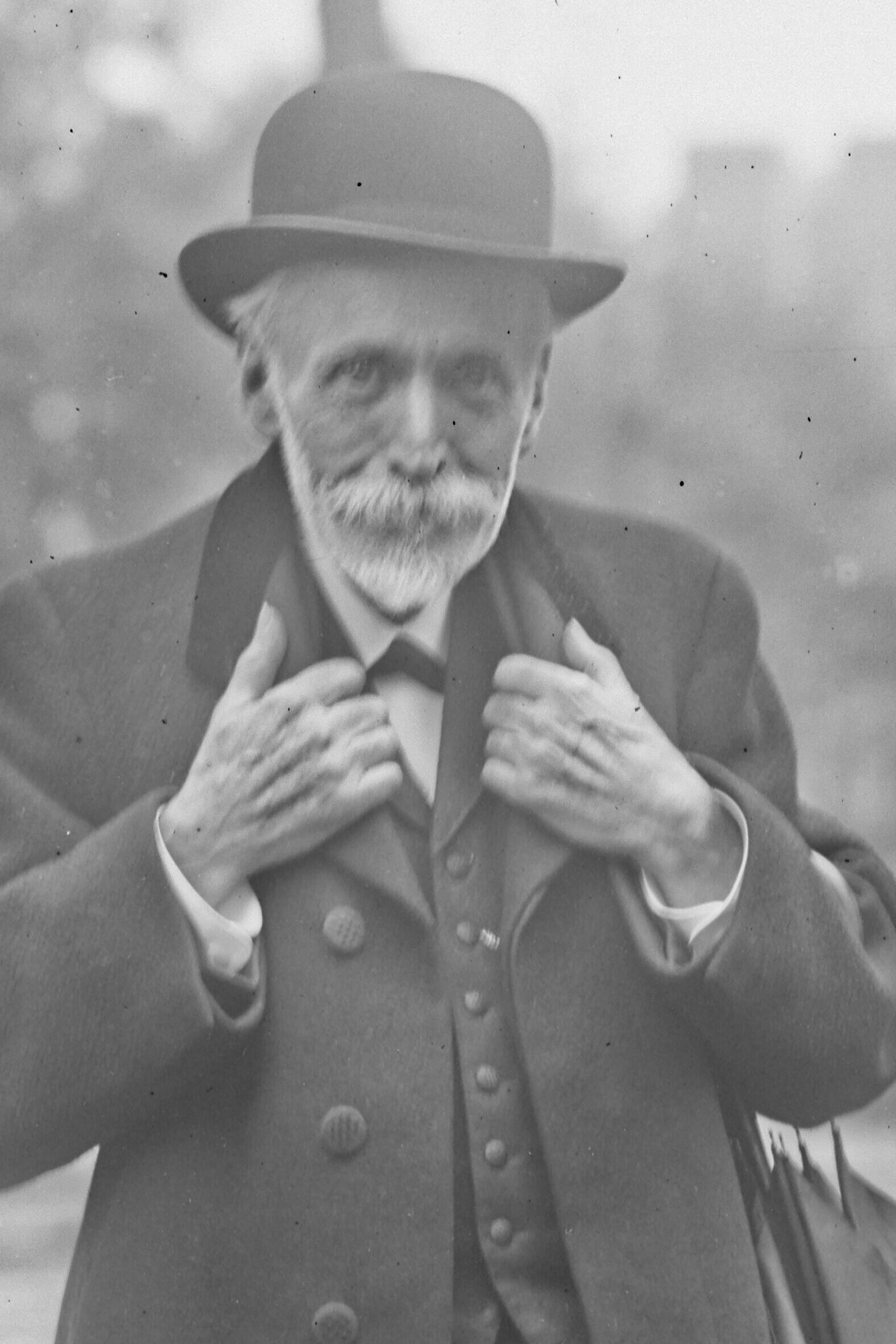
Ménétrier in 1923.

Pierre Eugène Ménétrier (7 December 1859 – 22 August 1935) was a French pathologist from Paris. He is remembered for his description of a rare gastric disorder that was later to become known as Ménétrier's disease.

In 1888 Ménétrier first described the disorder while performing post-mortem studies, noticing hyperplastic changes of the gastric mucosa in cadavers. At the time, he named the disease polyadenomes en nappe. Although Ménétrier understood the debilitative factors of the disease, it wouldn't be until years later that the associated protein-losing enteropathic aspects of the disorder were realized. Other names for "Ménétrier's disease" are "hyperplastic hypersecretory gastropathy" and "giant hypertrophic gastritis". He published his findings in a treatise titled Des polyadenomes gastriques et de leurs rapports avec le cancer de l’estomac.

Ménétrier published writings on Byzantine and Greco-Roman medicine, and was a member of the International Society for the History of Medicine. In 1935 he died from injuries sustained in an automobile accident in Lisieux.
