= Eosinophilic gastroenteritis =

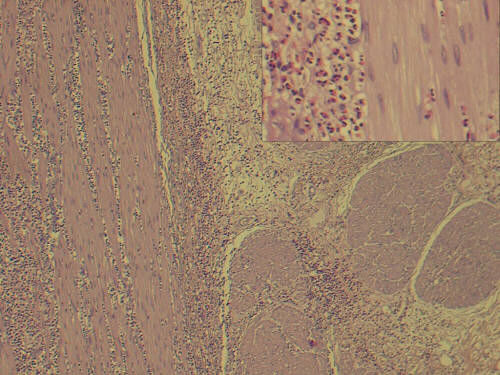
- H&E stain: Dense eosinophilic infiltration of gastro-duodenal wall
- Specialty: Immunology, gastroenterology

Eosinophilic gastroenteritis (EG or EGE), also known as eosinophilic enteritis, is a rare and heterogeneous condition characterized by patchy or diffuse eosinophilic infiltration of gastrointestinal (GI) tissue, first described by Kaijser in 1937. Presentation may vary depending on location as well as depth and extent of bowel wall involvement and usually runs a chronic relapsing course. It can be classified into mucosal, muscular, and serosal types based on the depth of involvement. Any part of the GI tract can be affected, and isolated biliary tract involvement has also been reported. The stomach is the organ most commonly affected, followed by the small intestine and the colon.

== Signs and symptoms ==
EG typically presents with a combination of chronic nonspecific GI symptoms, which include abdominal pain, diarrhea, occasional nausea and vomiting, weight loss, and abdominal distension. Approximately 80% have symptoms for several years; a high degree of clinical suspicion is often required to establish the diagnosis, as the disease is extremely rare. It does not come on suddenly but takes about 3–4 years to develop, depending upon the age of the patient. Occasionally, the disease may manifest itself as an acute abdomen or bowel obstruction.

- Mucosal EG (25–100%) is the most common variety, which presents with features of malabsorption and protein losing enteropathy. Failure to thrive and anaemia may also be present. Lower gastrointestinal bleeding may imply colonic involvement.
- Muscular EG (13–70%) present with obstruction of the gastric outlet or small intestine; sometimes as an obstructing caecal mass or intussusception.
- Subserosal EG (4.5% to 9% in Japan and 13% in the US) presents with ascites which is usually exudative in nature, abundant peripheral eosinophilia, and has favourable responses to corticosteroids.
- Other documented features are cholangitis, pancreatitis, eosinophilic splenitis, acute appendicitis and giant refractory duodenal ulcer.

== Pathophysiology ==
Peripheral blood eosinophilia and elevated serum IgE are usual but not universal. The damage to the gastrointestinal tract wall is caused by eosinophilic infiltration and degranulation.

As a part of host defense mechanism, eosinophils are normally present in gastrointestinal mucosa, though the finding in deeper tissue is almost always pathologic. What triggers such dense infiltration in EG is not clear. Different pathogenetic mechanisms of disease may be involved in several subgroups of patients. Food allergy and variable IgE response to food substances has been observed in some patients, which implies the role of hypersensitive response in pathogenesis. Many patients indeed have history of other atopic conditions like eczema, asthma, etc.

Eosinophil recruitment into inflammatory tissue is a complex process, regulated by several inflammatory cytokines. In EG cytokines IL-3, IL-5 and granulocyte macrophage colony stimulating factor (GM-CSF) may be behind the recruitment and activation. They have been observed immunohistochemically in the diseased intestinal wall. In addition eotaxin has been shown to have an integral role in regulating the homing of eosinophils into the lamina propria of stomach and small intestine. In the allergic subtype of disease, it is thought that food allergens cross the intestinal mucosa and trigger an inflammatory response that includes mast cell degranulation and eosinophil recruitment.

== Diagnosis ==
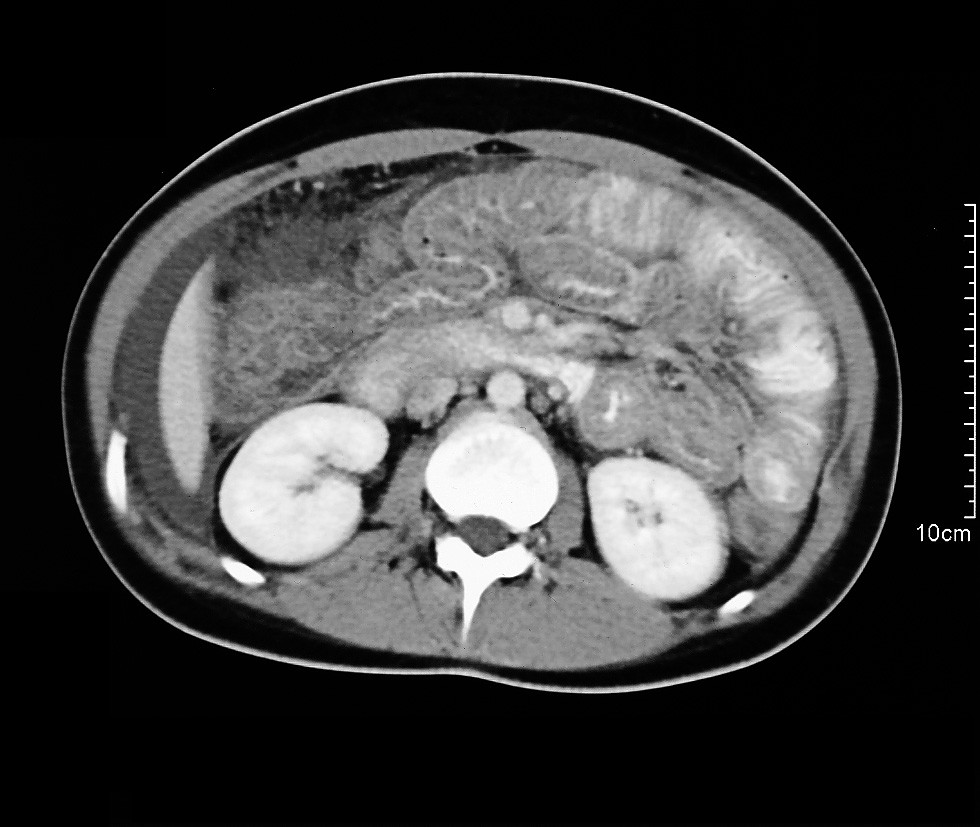
Spiral CT showing ascites and concentric thickening of colon and ileum in EG

Talley et al. suggested three diagnostic criteria which are still widely used:

1. the presence of gastrointestinal symptoms,
2. histological demonstration of eosinophilic infiltration in one or more areas of the gastrointestinal tract or presence of high eosinophil count in ascitic fluid (latter usually indicates subserosal variety),
3. no evidence of parasitic or extraintestinal disease.

Hypereosinophilia, the hallmark of allergic response, may be absent in up to 20% of patients, but hypoalbuminaemia and other abnormalities suggestive of malabsorption may be present. CT scans may show nodular and irregular thickening of the folds in the distal stomach and proximal small bowel, but these findings can also be present in other conditions like Crohn's disease and lymphoma.

The endoscopic appearance in eosinophilic gastroenteritis is nonspecific; it includes erythematous, friable, nodular, and occasional ulcerative changes. Sometimes diffuse inflammation results in complete loss of villi, involvement of multiple layers, submucosal oedema and fibrosis.

Definitive diagnosis involves histological evidence of eosinophilic infiltration in biopsy slides. Microscopy reveals >20 eosinophils per high power field. Infiltration is often patchy, can be missed and laparoscopic full thickness biopsy may be required.

Radio isotope scan using technetium (^{99m}Tc) exametazime-labeled leukocyte SPECT may be useful in assessing the extent of disease and response to treatment but has little value in diagnosis, as the scan does not help differentiating EG from other causes of inflammation.

When eosinophilic gastroenteritis is observed in association with eosinophilic infiltration of other organ systems, the diagnosis of idiopathic hypereosinophilic syndrome should be considered.

== Management ==
Corticosteroids are the mainstay of therapy, with a 90% response rate in some studies. Appropriate duration of steroid treatment is unknown, and relapse often necessitates long-term treatment. Various steroid sparing agents e.g. sodium cromoglycate (a stabilizer of mast cell membranes), ketotifen (an antihistamine), and montelukast (a selective, competitive leukotriene receptor antagonist) have been proposed, centering on an allergic hypothesis, with mixed results. Oral budesonide (an oral steroid) can be useful in treatment, as well. An elimination diet may be successful if a limited number of food allergies are identified. An elemental diet may also be successful in the treatment of children.

In a randomized clinical trial, lirentelimab was found to improve eosinophil counts and symptoms in individuals with eosinophilic gastritis and duodenitis.

== Epidemiology ==
Epidemiology may differ between studies, as the number of cases is small, with approximately 300 EG cases reported in published literature.

EG can present at any age and across all races, with a slightly higher incidence in males. Earlier studies showed a higher incidence in the third to fifth decades of life.

== Other gastrointestinal conditions associated with allergy ==
- Eosinophilic esophagitis
- Eosinophilic ascites
- Coeliac disease
- Protein losing enteropathy, from intolerance to cow's milk protein
- Infantile formula protein intolerance

== See also ==
- Aeroallergen
- Allergy
- Gastroenteritis
- Malabsorption
