= Hydremia =

Hydremia (or hydraemia) is an increase in the amount of water in blood. The term is considered obsolete. Hydremia may be a relative or absolute increase in the water content or volume of blood relative to solid components of blood. Historical usage has variously defined hydremia as synonymous with hypoalbuminemia, dilutional hyponatremia, and dilution anemia.
