= Hydrops =

Hydrops may refer to:

== Medicine ==
- Hydrops (/ˈhaɪdrɒps/ HI-drops), the excessive accumulation of serous fluid in tissues or cavities of the body, corresponding to any of various conditions, depending on characteristics and anatomic site, including:
  - Most generally
    - Edema (hydropsy, dropsy)
      - Anasarca, a severe and widespread form of edema
    - Ascites, fluid buildup in the abdomen
    - Effusion (medical senses)—see Effusion (disambiguation)
  - More specifically
    - Endolymphatic hydrops, edema in the inner ear, present in Ménière's disease
    - Cochlear hydrops, a variant of Meniere's disease/Endolymphatic Hydrops without vertigo.
    - Hydrops fetalis, edema in a fetus
    - Corneal hydrops, humoral edema of the eye

== Zoology ==
- Hydrops (snake), a dipsadid snake genus
