= Waldmann disease =

- Other names: Waldmann's disease, Primary intestinal lymphangiectasia

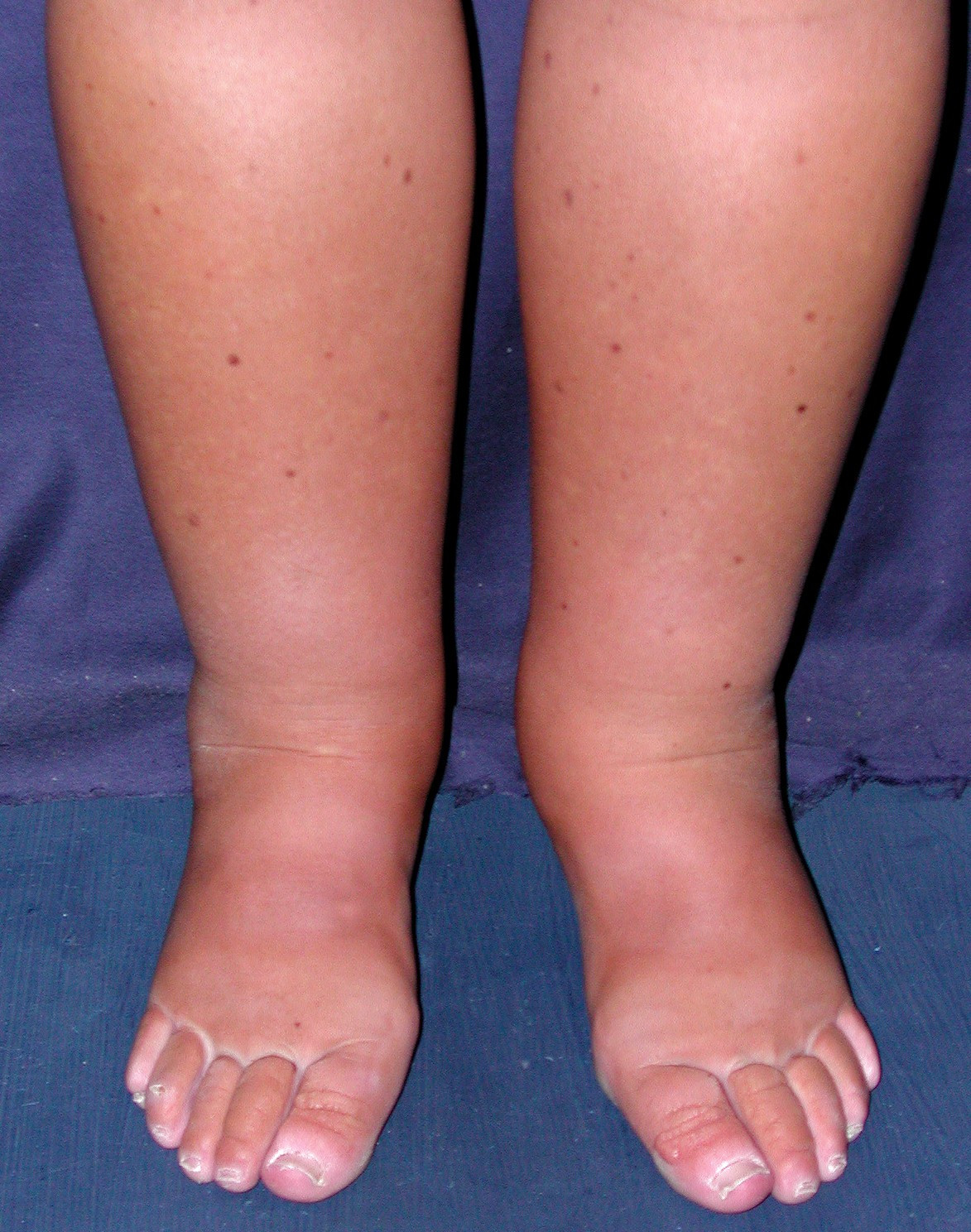
The lower legs and feet of a 23-year-old woman with Waldmann’s since infancy

Waldmann disease, also known as Primary Intestinal Lymphangiectasia (PIL), is a rare disease characterized by enlargement of the lymph vessels supplying the lamina propria of the small intestine. Although its prevalence is unknown, it being classified as a "rare disease" means that less than 200,000 of the population of the United States are affected by this condition and its subtypes and there have been approximately 50 reported cases of adult-onset PIL since 1961.

== Signs and symptoms ==
Signs and symptoms of the disease include diarrhea, nausea, swelling of the legs, protein-losing enteropathy, immunodeficiency and loss of lymphatic fluid into the intestines. It is usually diagnosed before the patient is 3 years old, but it is sometimes diagnosed in adults.

== Pathophysiology ==
The pathophysiology of PIL is centered around the dilation of the lymphatic vessels in the intestinal mucosa, submucosa, and sometimes the mesentery. This dilation impedes the normal flow of lymph from the intestines back to the circulatory system. The overflow of lymphatic fluid into the intestines leads to the loss of lymphocytes, immunoglobulins, and proteins, causing lymphopenia, hypogammaglobulinemia, and hypoalbuminemia, respectively. The loss of proteins contributes to the development of protein-losing enteropathy, a major clinical manifestation of this disease.

Patients with PIL present with a range of symptoms, significantly influenced by the extent of protein loss. Chronic diarrhea and malabsorption are common symptoms. The loss of protein can lead to edema, particularly in the legs and abdomen, due to decreased oncotic pressure. Nutritional deficiencies may develop due to malabsorption, leading to growth retardation in children and weight loss in adults. Immune abnormalities resulting from lymphocyte loss can predispose patients to recurrent infections. The clinical presentation of PIL can range from asymptomatic to severe, implying a broad clinical spectrum. Some adult patients may exhibit minimal or subtle clinical features, diverging from the "textbook" presentations often associated with severe cases. This variability underscores the importance of considering PIL in differential diagnoses, even when clinical manifestations are not severe or typical.

== Diagnosis ==
The disease is diagnosed by doing a biopsy of the affected area. Severity of the disease is then determined by measuring alpha_{1}-antitrypsin proteins in a stool sample.

== Management ==
Once the main cause of the disease is treated, a diet of low-fat and high-protein aliments, supplemental calcium and certain vitamins has been shown to reduce symptom effects. Adding medium-chain triglycerides (MCTs) to the diet allows for increased caloric intake while adhering to dietary restrictions, helping to manage symptoms such as diarrhea and steatorrhea and promoting growth in affected individuals. This diet, however, is not a cure. If the diet is stopped, the symptoms will eventually reappear. Medication is also used to treat this disease, including octreotide, sirolimus, anti-plasmin and, at least in one case, trametinib.

== History ==
The disease was first reported in 1961 by T. A. Waldmann. He described 18 cases of patients having a low level ^{131}I-albumin. Biopsies of the small intestine were examined under the microscope and found various levels of dilatation of the lymph vessels.
