= Thomas A. Waldmann =

American immunologist (1930–2021)

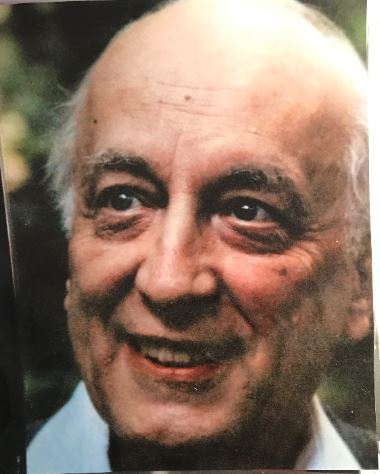
Thomas Waldmann

Thomas A. Waldmann (21 September 1930 – 25 September 2021) was an American immunologist who has worked on therapeutic monoclonal antibodies to the IL-2 receptor, Interleukin 15 (IL-15), and Adult T-cell Leukemia (ATL). Until the week he died, he was an active distinguished investigator at the Lymphoid Malignancies Branch of the National Cancer Institute.

== Biography and career ==
Thomas A. Waldmann was born in New York City as the only child of Elisabeth Sipos and Charles Waldmann. He received his M.D. from Harvard Medical School in 1955. He joined the National Cancer Institute in 1956 and became chief of the Lymphoid Malignancies Branch (formerly Metabolism Branch) in 1973. He married the late Katharine Waldmann in 1958 and has three children: Richard, Robert, and Carol Waldmann.

== Research ==
Waldmann's research has focused on lymphokines, their receptors, and use of lymphokines and monoclonal antibodies to their receptors in the treatment of cancer and of autoimmune diseases. He studied the IL-2/IL-2 receptor system in the growth of normal and neoplastic cells. He co-discovered IL-15 and has initiated clinical trials employing IL-15 in the treatment of metastatic malignancy.

He studied the role played by the receptor for interleukin-2 (IL-2) on the growth, differentiation and regulation of normal and neoplastic T-cells. He defined the IL-2 receptor subunits IL-2R beta and IL-2R alpha using the first reported anticytokine monoclonal antibody (anti-Tac) leading to the definition of the IL-2R alpha as a target for the therapy of leukemia and autoimmune diseases.

The scientific basis for this approach was that normal resting cells do not express IL-2R alpha, but it is expressed by abnormal T-cells in patients with lymphoid malignancies. He introduced different forms of IL-2R-directed therapy, including unmodified murine antibodies to IL-2R alpha (anti-Tac, the first antibody to a cytokine receptor to receive FDA approval), humanized anti-Tac (daclizumab, Zenapax) and the antibody armed with toxins or alpha and beta-emitting radionuclides.

He showed that daclizumab contributes to reducing renal transplant rejection and is of value in the treatment of T-cell-mediated autoimmune disorders including multiple sclerosis.

He demonstrated that refractory and relapsed Hodgkin's lymphoma (HL) patients could be effectively treated with daclizumab armed with Yttrium-90, because most normal cells do not express CD25, but it is expressed by some Reed-Sternberg cells and by rosetting polyclonal T-cells in lymphomatous masses. Responses were seen among the patients whose Reed-Sternberg cells were CD25 negative, provided that the associated rosetting T-cells expressed CD25.

Waldmann co-discovered the cytokine interleukin 15 (IL-15) and elucidated its role in the development of NK and CD8-memory T cells and its inhibition of activation induced cell death. He demonstrated that it is bound to IL-15 R alpha on the surface of antigen presenting cells and presented in trans to T-cells in an immune synapse. He demonstrated that IL-15 is useful in the treatment of cancer in mice and has completed a clinical trial using IL-15 in therapy of patients with metastatic melanoma and renal cell cancer.

Furthermore, Waldmann demonstrated that vaccines containing IL-15 induced long-lasting, high-avidity CD8-mediated CTL immunity.

Waldmann studied adult T-cell leukemia that develops in individuals infected with the retrovirus human T-cell lymphotropic virus-1 (HTLV-1). Dr. Waldmann demonstrated that the HTLV-1 encoded protein Tax constitutively activates two autocrine (IL-2R/IL-2, IL-15R/IL-15) and one paracrine (IL-9) system. Waldmann demonstrated that daclizumab provides effective therapy for some patients with a previously invariably fatal leukemia, HTLV-I associated adult T-cell leukemia (ATL).

In the early 80s Waldmann studied immunoglobulin gene rearrangement in and cell surface markers on acute lymphocyte leukemias.

In 1961 Waldmann described Waldmann disease.
