= Heidelberg test =

Medical diagnostic test

- Purpose: diagnosis of hypochlorhydria

The Heidelberg test is a medical diagnostic test used in the diagnosis of hypochlorhydria, i.e. insufficient hydrochloric acid in the stomach, hyperchlorhydria, achlorhydria, and for suspected bile reflux.

When performing the Heidelberg test, the patient swallows a small electronic device about the size of a vitamin capsule. This device tracks acid levels in the stomach as the patient swallows small amounts of baking soda, which neutralises the hydrochloric acid in the stomach. If the acid level does not return to normal after the baking soda is swallowed, the patient has hypochlorhydria.

The capsule is attached to a long thread to control the position of the capsule in the stomach. After the pH measurements have been recorded, the capsule may be allowed to pass into the intestine and be expelled through the rectum. The testing procedure may take 1–2 hours.

The Heidelberg Diagnostic test is used to diagnose Hypochlorhydria (reduced acid production), Hyperchlorhydria (excessive acid production), Achlorhydria (no acid production), Pyloric Insufficiency, Heavy Stomach Mucus (from infection or ulceration), Acute and Sub-acute Gastritis.

The test will also allow the physician to observe peristaltic activity, delayed and marked delayed emptying of the stomach (Gastroparesis) and dumping syndrome. The test is an in-office procedure that does not require the use of a catheter, or sedation. There are two methods of testing with the pH capsule. The first method requires the use of a fine medical grade thread (tether) that is attached to the capsule, so that it can be suspended in the stomach for extended testing of the stomachs parietal cells. Testing the parietal cells requires challenging the cells with a sodium bicarbonate solution that will cause the stomach to become neutral or alkaline. The time it takes for the stomach to reacidify back down to its original fasting acid level will determine what condition the patient has. Reacidification time is vitally important in determining hypochlorhydria, hyperchlorhydria and achlorhydria. The second method of testing allows an untethered capsuled to migrate through the alimentary canal for testing the stomach, small and large bowel. This method requires a complete medical history in a controlled environment.

== See also ==
- Description of Heidelberg pH test and test preparation
