= Circular folds =

Valvular flaps in the small intestine

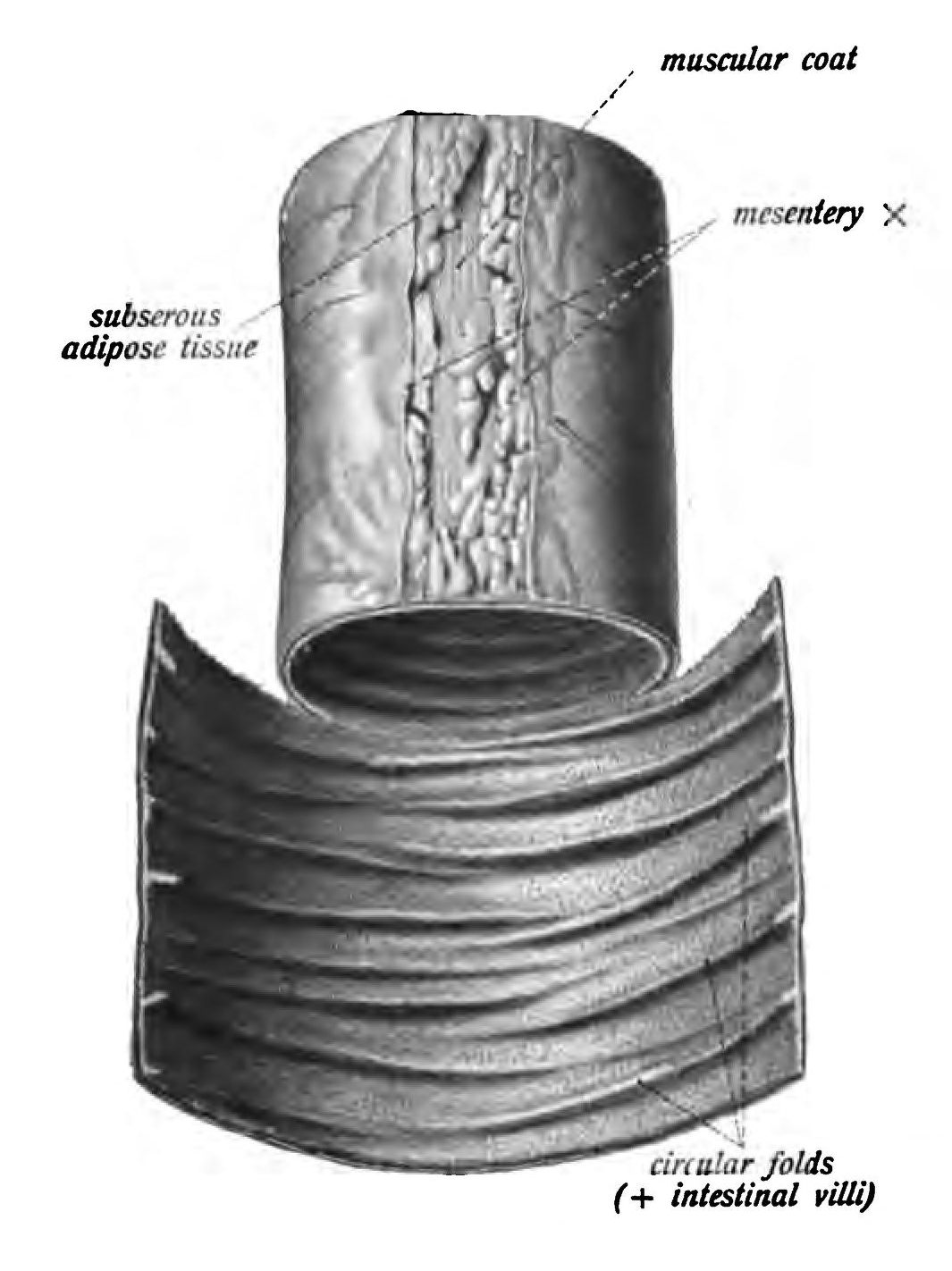
- Small intestine (jejunus-ileum) with circular folds.

Details
- Location: Small intestine

Identifiers
- Latin: plicae circulares
- TA98: A05.6.01.007
- TA2: 2943
- FMA: 15071

The circular folds (also known as valves of Kerckring, valves of Kerchkring, plicae circulares, plicae circulae, and valvulae conniventes) are large valvular flaps projecting into the lumen of the small intestine.

== Structure ==
The entire small intestine has circular folds of mucous membrane. The majority extend transversely around the cylinder of the small intestine, for about one-half or two-thirds of its circumference. Some form complete circles. Others have a spiral direction. The latter usually extend a little more than once around the bowel, but occasionally two or three times. While the larger folds are about 1 cm in depth at their broadest part, most folds are smaller. There tends to be an alternating pattern between larger and smaller folds.

=== Distribution ===
They are not found at the commencement of the duodenum, but begin to appear about 2.5 or 5 cm beyond the pylorus.

In the lower part of the descending portion, below the point where the bile and pancreatic ducts enter the small intestine, they are very large and closely approximated.

In the horizontal and ascending portions of the duodenum and upper half of the jejunum, they are large and numerous. From this point, down to the middle of the ileum, they diminish considerably in size.

In the lower part of the ileum, they almost entirely disappear; hence the comparative thinness of this portion of the intestine, as compared with the duodenum and jejunum.

=== Difference from other gastrointestinal folds ===
Unlike the gastric folds in the stomach, they are permanent, and are not obliterated when the intestine is distended.

The spaces between circular folds are smaller than the haustra of the colon, and, in contrast to haustra, circular folds reach around the whole circumference of the intestine. These differences can assist in distinguishing the small intestine from the colon on an abdominal x-ray.

== Function ==
The circular folds slow the passage of the partly digested food along the intestines, and afford an increased surface for absorption. They are covered with small finger-like projections called villi (singular, villus). Each villus, in turn, is covered with microvilli. The microvilli absorb fats and nutrients from the chyme.

== History ==
The circular folds are also called the valves of Kerckring, valves of Kerchkring, plicae circulares, plicae circulae, and valvulae conniventes.
