= Lirentelimab =

Monoclonal antibody

Monoclonal antibody
- Type: Whole antibody
- Source: Humanized
- Target: SIGLEC8

Clinical data
- Trade names: AK002
- Routes of administration: Intravenous

Identifiers
- CAS Number: 2283348-97-8
- UNII: SWS48LJU3T
- KEGG: D11906
- ChEMBL: ChEMBL4297878

Chemical and physical data
- Formula: C_{6408}H_{9884}N_{1700}O_{2006}S_{46}
- Molar mass: 144310.21 g·mol^{−1}

Lirentelimab (called AK002 during preclinical development) is a humanized nonfucosylated monoclonal antibody that targets sialic acid-binding Ig-like lectin 8 (SIGLEC8). It was discovered and developed by Allakos. Allakos tested it several conditions driven by overactivation of eosinophils and mast cells but after it failed in two Phase II trials in 2024, Allakos stopped working on it.

== Description ==
Lirentelimab is a humanized, nonfucosylated IgG1 monoclonal antibody that targets Siglec-8; it removes eosinophils by triggering natural killer cells to kill them. Siglec-8 is an inhibitory receptor present on eosinophils and mast cells, with low level expression on basophils. Interleukin-5, granulocyte-macrophage colony stimulating factor, and interleukin-33 enhance anti-Siglec-8 mediated destruction of eosinophils. Lirentelimab inhibits mast cells' IgE-mediated degranulation and de novo synthesis of prostaglandin D2 in vitro.

== Research ==
Lirentelimab has been studied in clinical trials for conditions in which eosinophils are overactive - for example in chronic spontaneous urticaria, indolent systemic mastocytosis, and severe allergic conjunctivitis. In January 2025, after the drug candidate failed in a phase II trial in atopic dermatitis and in a phase IIb study in chronic spontaneous urticaria, the company developing it, Allakos, ceased development of lirentelimbab. In 2025 Allakos and its assets were acquired by Concentra Biosciences, controlled by Tang Capital Management.
