= Albondin =

Cell receptor that binds serum albumin

In medicine and pharmacology, albondin (gp60) is a cell receptor that binds serum albumin. It seems to be expressed on endothelial cells and binding induces endocytosis. Not much is known about this protein, except for its approximate molecular mass of 60 kDa.
