= Ménétrier's disease =

Premalignant stomach disorder

Ménétrier disease
- Other names: Hypoproteinemic hypertrophic gastropathy
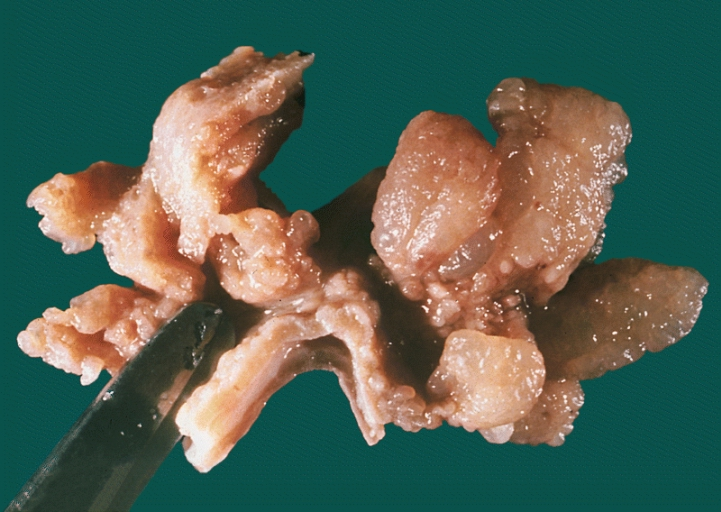
- Biopsy of the stomach in Ménétrier disease; the substantial pit hyperplasia makes the large rugal folds appear to be covered by myriad polyps resembling hyperplastic polyps. The muscularis propria is the folded structure at the bottom center.
- Specialty: Gastroenterology

Ménétrier disease is a rare, acquired, premalignant disease of the stomach characterized by massive gastric folds, gastric hyperplasia, excessive mucus production with resultant protein loss, and little or no acid production (achlorhydria). The disorder is associated with excessive secretion of transforming growth factor alpha (TGF-α). It is named after French physician Pierre Eugène Ménétrier (1859–1935).

== Signs and symptoms ==
Individuals with the disease present with upper abdominal (epigastric) pain, at times accompanied by nausea, vomiting, loss of appetite, edema, weakness, and weight loss. A small amount of gastrointestinal bleeding may occur, which is typically due to superficial mucosal erosions; large volume bleeding is rare. 20% to 100% of patients, depending on time of presentation, develop a protein-losing gastropathy accompanied by low blood albumin and edema.

Symptoms and pathological features of Ménétrier disease in children are similar to those in adults, but disease in children is usually self-limited and often follows respiratory infection.

== Cause ==
The cause of Ménétrier disease is unknown, but it has been associated with HCMV infection in children and H. pylori infections in adults. Additionally, increased TGF-α has been noted in the gastric mucosa of patients with the disease.

While the pathophysiology of Ménétrier disease isn't fully understood, it is thought that an increase in EGFR signaling — the effect of increased TGF-alpha production responsible for the inhibition of acid production — gives rise to epithelial cell proliferation of the mucosa, causing a direct impact on malabsorption of nutrients, electrolytes, and vitamins in the bowel.

== Pathology ==
With Ménétrier disease, the stomach is characterized by large, tortuous gastric folds in the fundus and body, with the antrum generally spared, giving the mucosa a cobblestone or cerebriform (brain-like) appearance. Histologically, the most characteristic feature is massive foveolar hyperplasia (hyperplasia of surface and glandular mucous cells). The glands are elongated with a corkscrew-like appearance and cystic dilation is common. Inflammation is usually only modest, although some cases show marked intraepithelial lymphocytosis. Diffuse or patchy glandular atrophy, evident as hypoplasia of parietal and chief cells, is typical.

Although ICD-10 classifies it under "Other gastritis" (K29.6), and the lamina propria may contain mild chronic inflammatory infiltrate, Ménétrier disease is not considered a form of gastritis. It is rather considered one of the two most well understood hypertrophic gastropathies; the other being Zollinger–Ellison syndrome.

== Diagnosis ==
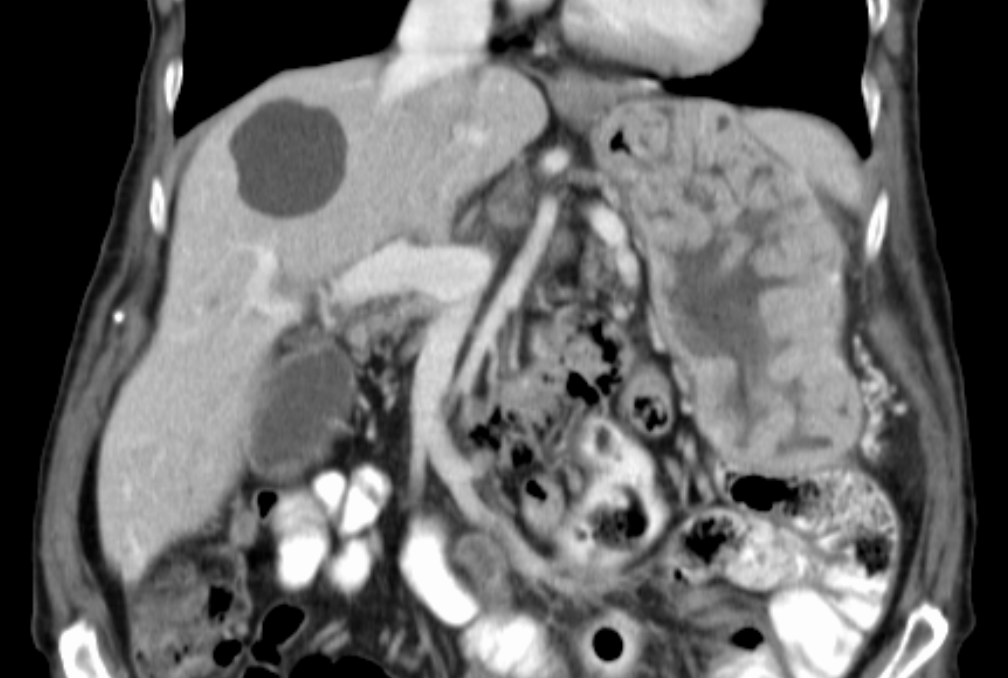
CT abdomen, coronal section, showing characteristic large rugal folds in the stomach. A cyst is also seen in the liver.

The large folds of the stomach, as seen in Ménétrier disease, are easily detected by x-ray imaging following a barium meal or by endoscopic methods. Due to the thickened rugae folds, it is said to have a cerebriform (brain-like) appearance. Endoscopy with deep mucosal biopsy (and cytology) is required to establish the diagnosis and exclude other entities that may present similarly. A non-diagnostic biopsy may lead to a surgically obtained full-thickness biopsy to exclude malignancy. CMV and helicobacter pylori serology should be a part of the evaluation.

Twenty-four-hour pH monitoring reveals hypochlorhydria or achlorhydria, and a chromium-labelled albumin test reveals increased GI protein loss. Serum gastrin levels will be within normal limits.

Other possible causes (e.g. differential diagnoses) of large folds within the stomach include: Zollinger-Ellison syndrome, cancer, cytomegalovirus infection, histoplasmosis, syphilis, and infiltrative disorders such as sarcoidosis.

== Treatment ==
Cetuximab is the first-line therapy for Ménétrier disease. Cetuximab is a monoclonal antibody against epidermal growth factor receptor (EGFR), and has been shown to be effective in treating Ménétrier disease.

Several medications have been used in the treatment of the condition, with variable efficacy. Such medications include: anticholinergic agents, prostaglandins, proton pump inhibitors, prednisone, and H2 receptor antagonists. Anticholinergics decrease protein loss. A high-protein diet should be recommended to replace protein loss in patients with low levels of albumin in the blood (hypoalbuminemia). Any ulcers discovered during the evaluation should be treated in standard fashion.

Severe disease with persistent and substantial protein loss despite cetuximab may require total removal of the stomach, especially when the disease is debilitating or irretractable or when there is a high risk for developing gastric cancer. Subtotal gastrectomy is performed by some; it may be associated with higher morbidity and mortality secondary to the difficulty in obtaining a patent and long-lasting anastomosis between normal and hyperplastic tissue. In adults, there is no FDA approved treatment other than gastrectomy and a high-protein diet. Cetuximab is approved for compassionate use in the treatment of the disease.

Pediatric cases are normally treated for symptoms with the disease clearing up in weeks to months.

== Epidemiology ==
The average age of onset is 40 to 60 years, and men are affected more often than women. Risk of gastric adenocarcinoma is increased in adults with Ménétrier disease. Less than 1,000 cases have been reported in human history.
