= Achlorhydria =

Pathologic lack of stomach acid production

- Other names: Hypochlorhydria
- Hydrogen chloride (major component of gastric acid)
- Pronunciation: /eɪklɔːrˈhaɪdriə/
- Specialty: Internal medicine
- Symptoms: Most of the time none, but may cause and not limited to, epigastric pain, other abdominal pain, unintentional weight loss, heartburn, nausea, vomiting, bloating, diarrhea, early satiety
- Complications: Small intestinal bacterial overgrowth, nutrient deficiencies, gastric adenocarcinoma (rare), gastric carcinoid tumor (rare)
- Causes: Pernicious anemia, helicobacter pylori infection, hypothyroidism, gastric bypass surgery, VIPoma, chronic PPI use, gastric cancer, (rarely) radiotherapy
- Treatment: Addressing underlying cause and managing SIBO and nutrient deficiencies

Achlorhydria and hypochlorhydria are states where the production of hydrochloric acid in gastric secretions of the stomach is absent or low, respectively. Achlorhydria is commonly a complication of some other disease, such as chronic Helicobacter pylori infection or autoimmune pernicious anemia, as well as a possible side effect of long-term use of proton pump inhibitors.

Complications of achlorhydria most frequently include small intestinal bacterial overgrowth and the nutritional deficiencies that can result from it. Rarely, achlorhydria may contribute to formation of gastric cancers or gastric carcinoid tumors.

== Signs and symptoms ==
Irrespective of the cause, achlorhydria can result in known complications of bacterial overgrowth and intestinal metaplasia, and symptoms are often consistent with those diseases:

- gastroesophageal reflux disease
- abdominal discomfort
- early satiety
- weight loss
- diarrhea
- constipation
- abdominal bloating
- anemia
- stomach infection
- malabsorption of food
- carcinoma of stomach

Since acidic pH facilitates iron absorption, achlorhydric patients often develop iron deficiency anemia.

Bacterial overgrowth, the most frequent complication of achlorhydria, can cause micronutrient deficiencies such as B12 deficiency and other nutrient deficiencies that result in various clinical neurological manifestations, including visual changes, paresthesias, ataxia, limb weakness, gait disturbance, memory defects, hallucinations and personality and mood changes. Nutritional deficiencies are the most common complication of achlorhydria. Even without bacterial overgrowth, low stomach acid (high pH) can lead to nutritional deficiencies through decreased absorption of basic electrolytes (magnesium, zinc, etc.) and vitamins (including vitamin C, vitamin K, and the B complex of vitamins).

Risk of particular infections, such as Vibrio vulnificus (commonly from seafood) and Vibrio cholerae is increased.

== Causes ==
- The slowing of the body's basal metabolic rate is associated with hypothyroidism.
- Pernicious anemia where there is antibody production against parietal cells which normally produce gastric acid.
- The use of antacids or drugs that decrease gastric acid production (such as H2-receptor antagonists) or transport (such as proton pump inhibitors).
  - Of these, proton pump inhibitors have the most direct and potent known effect.
- A symptom of rare diseases such as mucolipidosis (type IV).
- A symptom of Helicobacter pylori infection which neutralizes and decreases secretion of gastric acid to aid its survival in the stomach.
- A symptom of atrophic gastritis or of stomach cancer.
- Radiation therapy involving the stomach.
- Gastric bypass procedures such as a duodenal switch and RNY, where the largest acid-producing parts of the stomach are either removed or blinded.
- VIPomas (vasoactive intestinal peptides) and somatostatinomas are both islet cell tumors of the pancreas.
- Pellagra, caused by niacin deficiency.
- Chloride, sodium, potassium, zinc, and/or iodine deficiency, as these elements are needed to produce adequate levels of stomach acid (HCl).
- Sjögren's syndrome, an autoimmune disorder that destroys many of the body's moisture-producing enzymes.
- Ménétrier's disease, characterized by hyperplasia of mucous cells in the stomach, also causing excess protein loss, leading to hypoalbuminemia (presents with abdominal pain and edema).
- Cholera

== Risk factors ==
Prevalence

Achlorhydria is present in about 2.5% of the population under 60 years old and about 5% of the population over 60 years old. The incidence increases to around 12% in populations over 80 years old. An absence of hydrochloric acid increases with advancing age. A lack of hydrochloric acid produced by the stomach is one of the most common age-related causes of a harmed digestive system.

Among men and women, 27% experience a varying degree of achlorhydria. US researchers found that over 30% of women and men over the age of 60 have little to no acid secretion in the stomach. Additionally, 40% of postmenopausal women have shown to have no basal gastric acid secretion in the stomach, with 39.8% occurring in females 80 to 89 years old.

Comorbidities

Autoimmune disorders are also linked to advancing age, specifically autoimmune gastritis, which is when the body produces unwelcome antibodies and causes inflammation of the stomach. Autoimmune disorders are also a cause for small bacterial growth in the bowel and a deficiency of Vitamin B-12. These have also proved to be factors of acid secretion in the stomach. Autoimmune conditions can often be managed with various treatments; however, little is known about how or if these treatments effect achlorhydria.

Thyroid hormones can contribute to changes in the level of hydrochloric acid in the stomach, with unpredictable but strong fluctuations observed in states of both hypothyroidism and hyperthyroidism.

Long-term usage of medications or drugs

Extended use of antacids, antibiotics, and other drugs can contribute to hypochlorhydria. Proton pump inhibitors (PPIs) are very commonly used to temporarily relieve symptoms and conditions such as gastroesophageal reflux and peptic ulcers. Risk increases as these drugs are taken over a longer period, often many years, typically beyond the recommended therapeutic usage.

Stress can also be linked to symptoms associated with achlorhydria, including constant belching, constipation, and abdominal pain.

== Diagnosis ==
For practical purposes, gastric pH and endoscopy should be done in someone with suspected achlorhydria. Older testing methods using fluid aspiration through a nasogastric tube can be done, but these procedures can cause significant discomfort and are less efficient ways to obtain a diagnosis.

A complete 24-hour profile of gastric acid secretion is best obtained during an esophageal pH monitoring study.

Achlorhydria may also be documented by measurements of extremely low levels of pepsinogen A (PgA) (< 17 µg/L) in blood serum. The diagnosis may be supported by high serum gastrin levels (> 500–1000 pg/mL).

The "Heidelberg test" is an alternative way to measure stomach acid and diagnose hypochlorhydria/achlorhydria.

A check can exclude deficiencies in iron, calcium, prothrombin time, vitamin B-12, vitamin D, and thiamine. Complete blood count with indices and peripheral smears can be examined to exclude anemia. Elevation of serum folate is suggestive of small bowel bacterial overgrowth. Bacterial folate can be absorbed into the circulation.

Once achlorhydria is confirmed, a hydrogen breath test can check for bacterial overgrowth.

== Treatment ==
Treatment focuses on addressing the underlying cause of symptoms, as well as correction of any nutritional deficiencies, such as vitamin B-12 deficiency and the pernicious anemia that typically accompanies it.

Achlorhydria associated with Helicobacter pylori infection may respond to H. pylori eradication therapy, although resumption of gastric acid secretion may only be partial, and it may not always reverse the condition completely. Patients with known or suspected H. pylori infection should be followed and endoscopically evaluated over time, due to the risk of recurrence as well as potential gastric malignancy.

Antimicrobial agents, including rifaximin, metronidazole, amoxicillin/clavulanate potassium, ciprofloxacin, and others, can be used to treat bacterial overgrowth. Of these, rifaximin is the most well-studied and frequently used treatment for SIBO.

Achlorhydria resulting from long-term proton-pump inhibitor (PPI) use may be treated by dose reduction or withdrawal of the PPI.

== Prognosis ==
Achlorhydria generally has a good prognosis, even after accounting for small intestinal bacterial overgrowth (SIBO). Aside from SIBO, the major risk of achlorhydria is the possibility of the development of gastric adenocarcinoma or gastric carcinoid tumor.

SIBO is a chronic condition. Retreatment may be necessary once every 1–6 months. Prudent use of antibacterials now calls for an antimicrobial stewardship policy to manage antibiotic resistance.

== See also ==
- Atrophic gastritis
- Fundic gland polyposis
- Hyperchlorhydria
- Isopropamide
