= Effusion (disambiguation) =

Effusion is the process of gases passing through a small hole.

Effusion may also refer to:

== Medicine ==
The seeping of fluid into a body cavity, the fluid itself, or an abnormal collection of fluid in a body cavity or space:

- Ascites
- Pericardial effusion
- Pleural effusion
- Joint effusion
- Subdural Effusion
- Mastoid Effusion
- Knee effusion
- Sometimes called "hydrops"

== Geology ==
- Effusive eruption, an effusion of lava from a volcano
