= Hyperchlorhydria =

Condition in which stomach acid is higher than reference range

Hyperchlorhydria, sometimes called chlorhydria, sour stomach or acid stomach, refers to the state in the stomach where gastric acid levels are higher than the reference range. The combining forms of the name (chlor- + hydr-), referring to chlorine and hydrogen, are the same as those in the name of hydrochloric acid, which is the active constituent of gastric acid.

In humans, the normal pH is around 1 to 3, which varies throughout the day. The highest basal secretion levels are in the late evening (around 12 a.m. to 3 a.m.). Hyperchlorhydria is usually defined as having a pH less than 2.

In Zollinger–Ellison syndrome gastrin levels are increased, leading to excess gastric acid production, which can cause gastric ulcers. Hypercalcemia also increases gastrin and gastric acid and can cause ulcers.

== See also ==
- Achlorhydria
- Hypochlorhydria
