= Hypoalbuminemia =

Abnormally low levels of albumin in the blood

- Other names: Hypalbuminosis
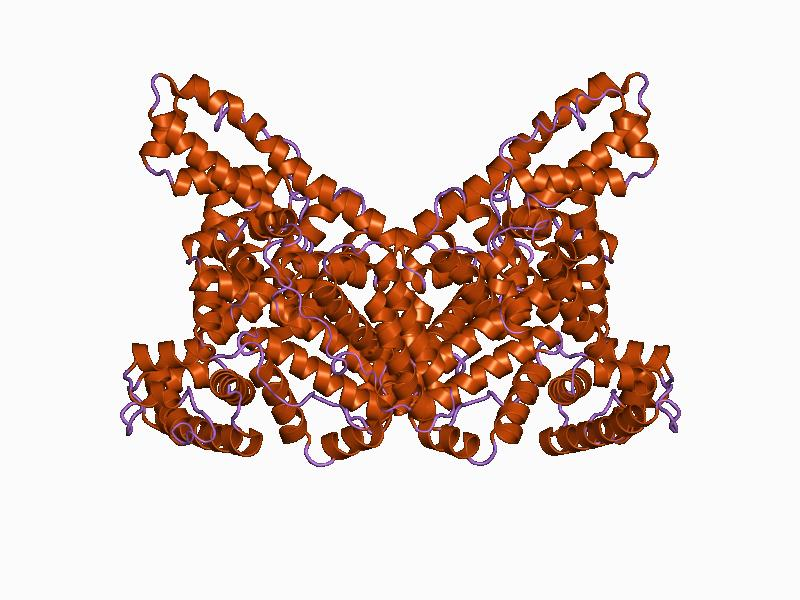
- Structure of albumin
- Specialty: Internal Medicine, Pediatrics
- Symptoms: Peripheral edema; ascites; effusions; fatigue; generalized weakness
- Complications: Hypovolemia, Circulatory collapse, Zinc deficiency, Hyperlipidemia
- Causes: Malabsorption (Protein Losing Enteropathy)
- Diagnostic method: Level below 3.5 grams per deciliter
- Treatment: Albumin infusion in hepatic resection (>40%), nephrotic syndrome (with diuretics and corticosteroids), spontaneous bacterial peritonitis (with antibiotics), and hepatorenal syndrome (with terlipressin)
- Frequency: 70% (elderly inpatients)

Hypoalbuminemia (or hypoalbuminaemia) is a medical sign in which the level of albumin in the blood is low. This can be due to decreased production in the liver, increased loss in the gastrointestinal tract or kidneys, increased use in the body, or abnormal distribution between body compartments. Patients often present with hypoalbuminemia as a result of another disease process such as malnutrition as a result of severe anorexia nervosa, sepsis, cirrhosis in the liver, nephrotic syndrome in the kidneys, or protein-losing enteropathy in the gastrointestinal tract. One of the roles of albumin is being the major driver of oncotic pressure (protein concentration within the blood) in the bloodstream and the body. Thus, hypoalbuminemia leads to abnormal distributions of fluids within the body and its compartments. As a result, associated symptoms include edema in the lower legs, ascites in the abdomen, and effusions around internal organs. Laboratory tests aimed at assessing liver function diagnose hypoalbuminemia. Once identified, it is a poor prognostic indicator for patients with a variety of different diseases. Yet, it is only treated in very specific indications in patients with cirrhosis and nephrotic syndrome. Treatment instead focuses on the underlying cause of the hypoalbuminemia. Albumin is an acute negative phase respondent and not a reliable indicator of nutrition status.

== Signs and symptoms ==
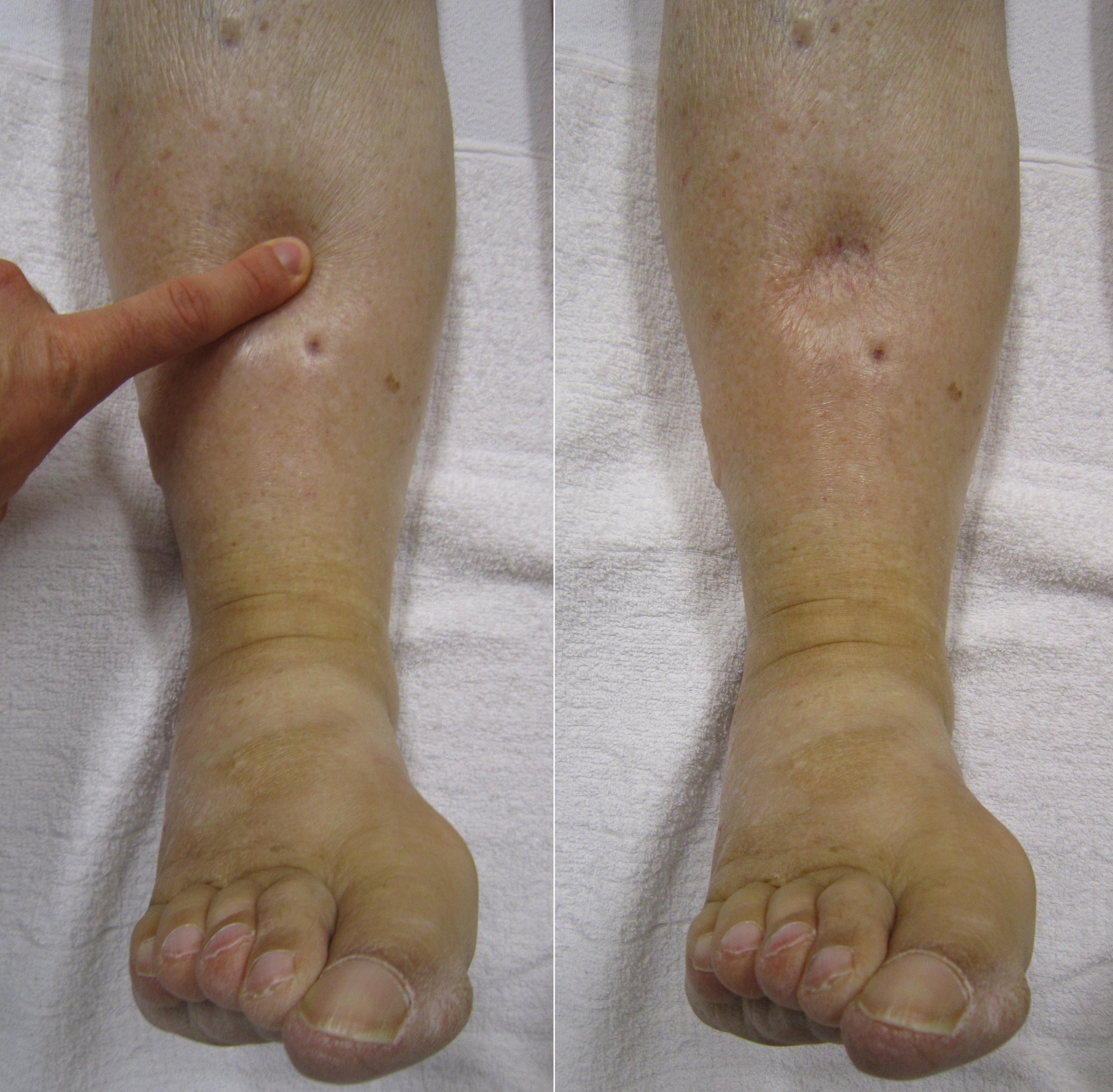
Pitting edema of the lower extremities commonly seen in conditions associated hypoalbuminemia.

Patients with hypoalbuminemia are more likely to present with it as a sign of an underlying disease process than as a primary disease process. By itself, hypoalbuminemia decreases the total protein concentration in blood plasma, also known as the colloid osmotic pressure, which causes fluid to exit the blood vessels into tissues to equalize the concentrations. This leads to fluid-induced swelling of the extremities known as edema, build-up of fluid in the abdomen known as ascites, and fluid surrounding internal organs known as effusions. Patients also present with nonspecific findings such as fatigue and excessive weakness. Muehrcke's lines are a strong indicator of hypoalbuminemia. Hypoalbuminemia by itself may present without any symptoms, as the congenital and complete loss of albumin seen in analbuminemia can be asymptomatic. Alternatively, it can present with death in utero prior to birth or as a disease of adults characterized by edema, fatigue, and hyperlipidemia. The reason for this heterogeneity of presentation is not well understood.

=== Complications ===
By itself, hypoalbuminemia can cause hypovolemia and circulatory collapse secondary to decreased oncotic pressure within the vascular system. Due to its metal-binding properties, hypoalbuminemia may lead to nutritional deficits including zinc deficiency. Hypoalbuminemia associated with the nephrotic syndrome can lead to the development of hyperlipidemia, although this is usually in the absence of atherosclerosis. Further, in patients on dialysis, hypoalbuminemia is associated with more advanced fluid overload.

== Causes ==
Hypoalbuminemia can be caused through a number of different mechanisms, each with the result of decreasing albumin levels. These include: 1) impaired synthesis within the liver, 2) increased utilization by tissue, 3) distributional issues, and 4) increased excretion or loss. Often, the cause is multifactorial as in liver cirrhosis, where reduced hepatic synthesis and increased capillary leakage combine to further decrease albumin levels.

=== Inflammation and infection ===
Albumin is considered a negative acute phase reactant, which means that as inflammation and other acute physiologic processes occur, its levels decrease. This is in contrast to acute phase reactants like C-reactive protein (CRP), whose levels increase with inflammatory processes. With respect to mechanism, inflammation leads to decreased production of albumin as a result of increased levels of cytokines, specifically IL-1, IL-6, and TNF-α. In patients with the overwhelming infections common in sepsis and septic shock, hypoalbuminemia occurs as a result of the combinatorial effects of decreased synthesis as above, increased utilization by tissues, and increased transcapillary leakage from blood vessels due to increased vascular permeability.

=== Liver disease ===
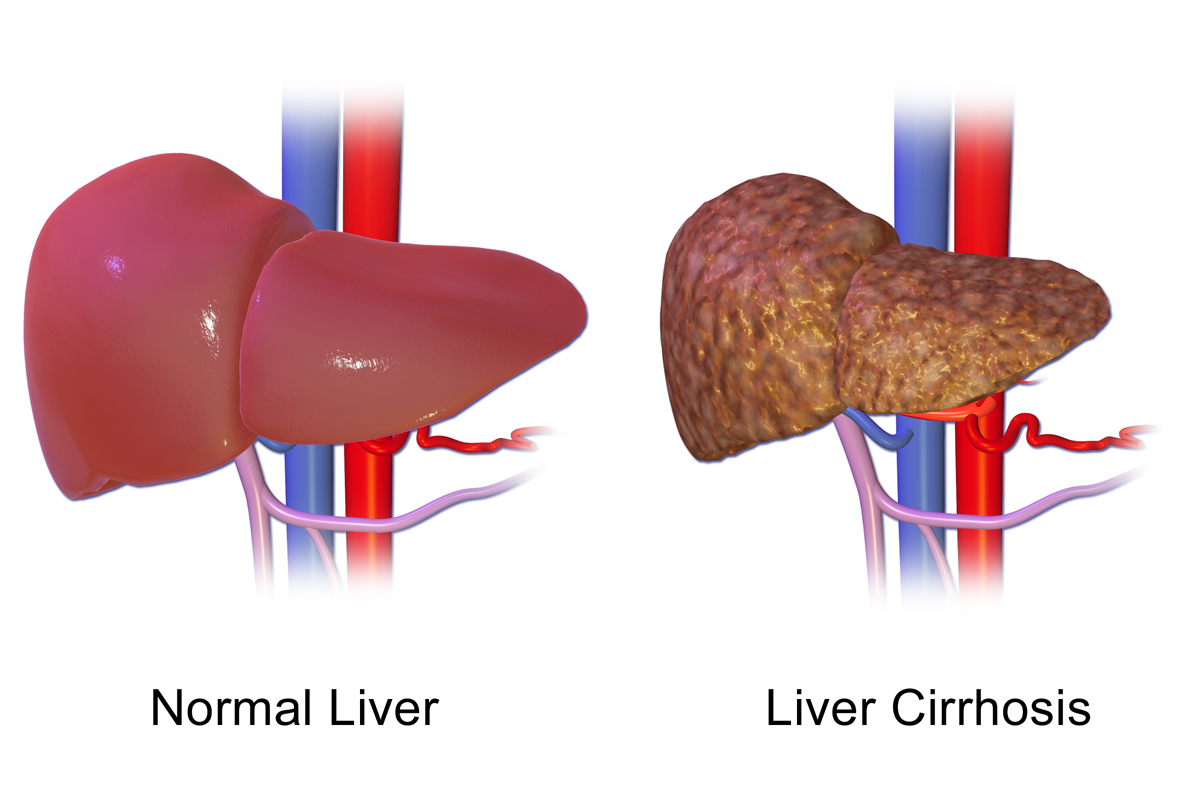
Healthy and cirrhotic liver. If present, hypoalbuminemia suggests advanced liver disease as seen in cirrhosis.

Albumin is synthesized in the liver, and low serum albumin can be indicative of liver failure or diseases such as cirrhosis and chronic hepatitis. If present, hypoalbuminemia is generally considered to be a sign of advanced hepatic cirrhosis, or irreversible damage to the liver. Production of albumin can be 60–80% lower in advanced cirrhosis than in healthy liver, an effect amplified by dilution (salt and water retention), fluid shifts (following the accumulation of albumin in extracellular space and ascitic fluid), and even post-transcriptional changes to albumin itself.

=== Kidney disease ===
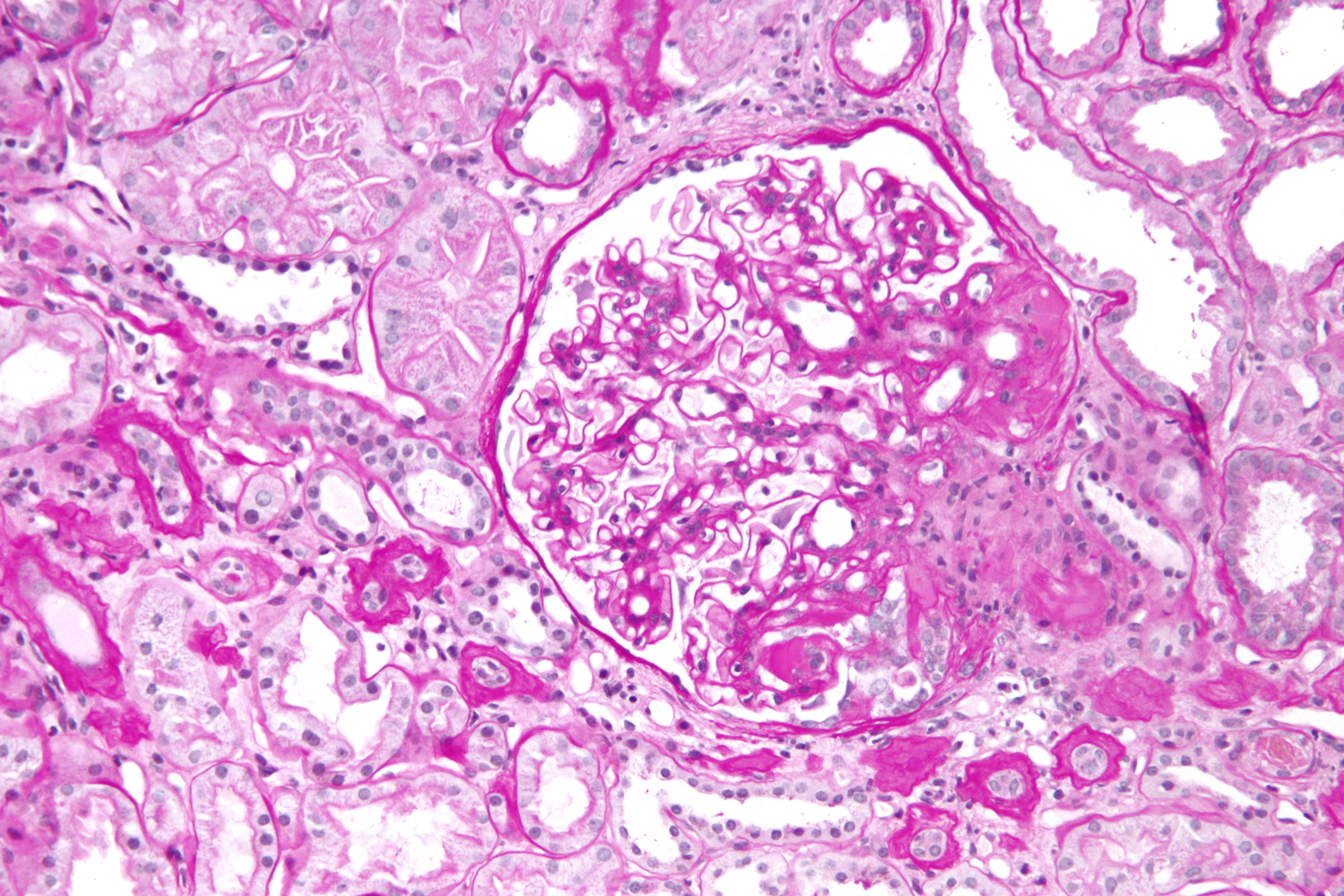
Kidney biopsy showing focal segmental glomerulosclerosis, one of the causes of nephrotic syndrome commonly seen in children.

Hypoalbuminemia can also present as part of the nephrotic syndrome, in which significant quantities of protein are lost in the urine due to kidney damage. Under normal conditions, less than 30 milligrams per day of albumin are lost via the glomerulus. In nephrotic syndrome, protein loss can be as great as 3.5 grams over 24 hours, much of which is albumin, itself leading to hypoalbuminemia. In children, nephrotic syndrome is commonly a primary disease process that is largely idiopathic, although more genetic causes are being identified with the cost and accessibility of whole exome sequencing. After renal biopsy, these syndromes are commonly diagnosed as minimal change disease, membranoproliferative glomerulonephritis, or focal segmental glomerulosclerosis. In adults, on the other hand, nephrotic syndrome is commonly a secondary disease process due to a variety of inciting factors. These inciting factors can be diverse, including toxins, drugs, heavy metals, autoantibodies, post-infectious antibody complexes, or immune complexes formed after malignancies like multiple myeloma.

Albuminuria and resultant hypoalbuminemia can also occur in chronic kidney disease without protein loss levels as high as seen in nephrotic syndrome. Here, albumin loss from the kidneys occur due to decreased glomerular filtration rate (GFR) and subsequent loss of 30 to 300 milligrams of albumin per day. Over the course of months, this can lead to hypoalbuminemia, a common feature of end-stage renal disease. Alterations in fluid distribution and the presence of ongoing inflammation in chronic kidney disease in combination with hypoalbuminemia make fluid status control especially difficult.

=== Malnutrition or malabsorption ===
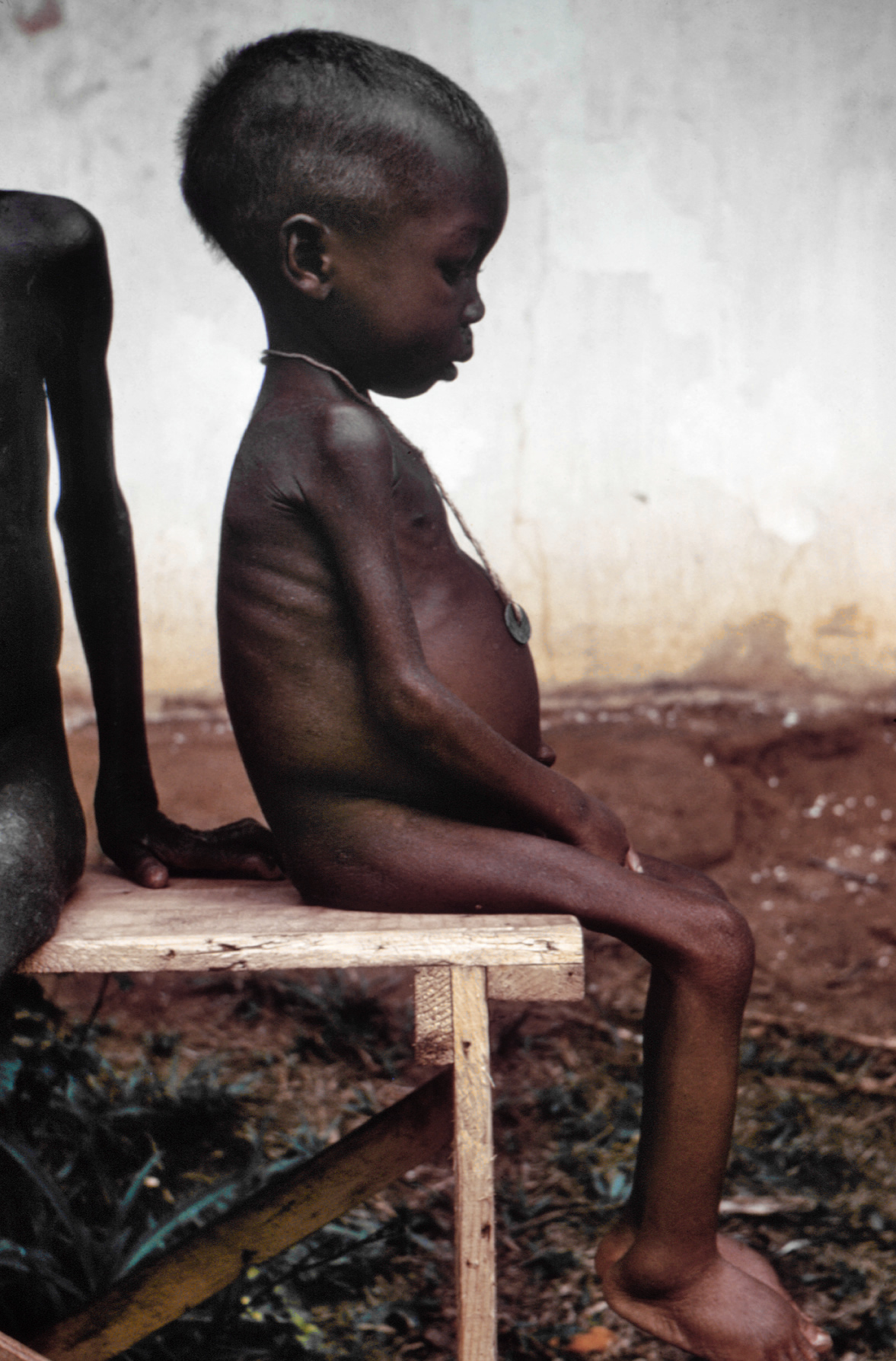
A girl with the physical signs and symptoms of Kwashiorkor, which is an extreme form of malnutrition-associated hypoalbuminemia.

Kwashiorkor is a disease of malnutrition characterized by decreased protein intake and amino acid deficiency resulting in hypoalbuminemia and a characteristic physical presentation. This is an extreme example of how malnutrition can result in hypoalbuminemia. More typical is malnutrition-associated hypoalbuminemia in the elderly, who appear thin and frail but not with the rounded abdomen and edema seen in Kwashiorkor. Albumin is an acute negative phase respondent and not a reliable indicator of nutrition status.

Low albumin levels can also indicate chronic malnutrition from protein losing enteropathy. This is often caused or exacerbated by ulcerative colitis, but can also be seen in cardiac disease and systemic lupus erythematosus. Broadly, protein-losing enteropathy can be caused by increased lymphatic pressure in the gastrointestinal tract as in lymphangiectasis, mucosal erosion-induced lack of absorption as in Crohn's disease and ulcerative colitis, and other diseases of malabsorption without mucosal erosions as in Celiac disease.

Eosinophilic gastritis presents with epigastric pain, peripheral blood eosinophilia, anemia, and hypoalbuminemia.

== Pathophysiology ==
The liver produces albumin and then secretes into the bloodstream, where it is then distributed into tissues across the body. In the liver, the liver synthesizes albumin as pre-proalbumin, converts it first into proalbumin and then albumin in hepatocytes, and releases it into the blood. The body synthesizes albumin at a rate of 10 to 15 grams per day. In the presence of hypoalbuminemia, the liver can increase production by as much as four times the baseline production rate. Once released, albumin distributes itself between the intravascular space (40%) in blood vessels, and extravascular spaces (60%) within the body's different tissues. In the blood plasma, albumin makes up 55 to 60% of total plasma protein by mass, with globulins making up a large part of the rest. In hypoalbuminemia, the amount of albumin in the intravascular space or blood plasma is what is being measured, meaning that abnormal distribution within the two compartments may contribute to a relative hypoalbuminemia in the bloodstream with a normal level in the whole body.

Once released into the body, albumin performs a number of functions that can be negatively affected by the reduced levels seen in hypoalbuminemia. These functions include regulation of colloid osmotic pressure or protein concentration within the blood plasma, transport of free fatty acids and other molecules to the liver (unconjugated bilirubin, metals, ions) for storage or utilization, binding of drugs and alteration of pharmacokinetics (half-life, biological activity levels, metabolism), buffering plasma pH, scavenging reactive oxygen species to avoid inflammation and associated damage, functioning as a reservoir of nitric oxide for the regulation of blood pressure, and prevention of coagulation and platelet aggregation in an action similar to the commonly used anticoagulant heparin. It also inhibits inflammatory mediators such as TNF-α and complement 5a (C5a) to reduce the overall inflammatory response.

A number of hormones (e.g. thyroxine, cortisol, testosterone), drugs, and other molecules are bound to albumin in the bloodstream and must be released from albumin before becoming biologically active. For example, calcium binds to albumin; in hypoalbuminemia, there is an increased amount of free ionized calcium, its biologically active form. In the presence of hypoalbuminemia, these functions are differentially affected, and the mechanisms by which they affect disease outcomes remains an area of active debate.

== Diagnosis ==
The serum albumin level is part of a standard panel of liver function tests (LFT) that also includes levels of plasma protein, bilirubin, alkaline phosphatase, alanine aminotransferase (ALT), and aspartate aminotransferase (AST). This is commonly ordered when liver disease is suspected as part of a comprehensive metabolic panel (CMP) in conjunction with the electrolyte panel known as the basic metabolic panel (BMP). In kidney disease, a CMP may be ordered as a follow-up test when proteinuria is detected by urine dipstick analysis, which may lead to a diagnosis of hypoalbuminemia. Low levels of serum albumin are defined as less than 3.5 grams per deciliter, while clinically significant hypoalbuminemia is generally considered to be less than 2.5 grams per deciliter. Upon discovery of hypoalbuminemia, a common work-up will include liver function tests to assess for liver disease, urine albumin and protein levels to assess for albuminuria and nephrotic syndrome, and brain natriuretic peptide to assess for cardiac failure. If protein-losing enteropathy is suspected based on clinical suspicion, an alpha-1 antitrypsin test can be performed. If stool alpha-1 antitrypsin is elevated, this suggests excessive gastrointestinal protein loss.

== Management ==
Treatment of hypoalbuminemia is largely focused on the underlying cause and not on the hypoalbuminemia itself. Albumin infusions can and are commonly performed although they are expensive and have not been shown to be more effective than colloid solutions in a number of conditions and situations. Examples of indications for albumin infusion include hypoalbuminemia in the context of major surgery such as hepatic resection >40%, nephrotic syndrome in conjunction with diuretics and corticosteroids, spontaneous bacterial peritonitis in combination with antibiotics, and rapidly progressing hepatorenal syndrome (type 1) in combination with terlipressin. It is also used to prevent iatrogenic hypoalbuminemia after therapeutic plasmapheresis if volume plasma exchange is greater than 20 milliliters per kilogram in one session or over one week across multiple sessions and after large volume (>5 liter) paracentesis in ascites. These indications have shown positive outcomes respective to their diseases, while conditions like malnourishment, burns (during the first 24 hours), and shock with traumatic brain injury either show no benefit or harm in randomized controlled trials. In liver disease and cirrhosis, in addition to the above indications, the use of albumin is being considered for bacterial infections other than spontaneous bacterial peritonitis, hepatic encephalopathy, and chronic ascites. Its use in these indications remains controversial. In kidney disease and nephrotic syndrome, albumin infusions as replacement for albumin loss to proteinuria is used in some cases of congenital nephrotic syndrome.

== Prognosis ==
By itself, low albumin levels are associated with increased mortality rate in the general population. In disease states specifically, hypoalbuminemia has been used a predictive factor for poor outcomes in a number of conditions, including periprosthetic joint infection treatment failure, and cirrhosis. Amongst patients admitted to intensive care units (ICUs), hypoalbuminemia is specifically associated with ICU-acquired muscle weakness. In chronic kidney disease, hypoalbuminemia is an indicator of frailty, which is itself associated with complications, mental distress, quality of life impairment, resource utilization, and mortality.

== Epidemiology ==
Hypoalbuminemia is commonly found in hospitalized patients, patients in the ICU, and the elderly within the hospital and the community. Amongst elderly patients, prevalence can be as high as 70%, as shown in a study from Southern Brasil.
