= Protein losing enteropathy =

- Upper and lower human gastrointestinal tract
- Protein losing enteropathy affects the GI tract
- Specialty: Gastroenterology
- Symptoms: Swelling of the legs
- Causes: Inflammatory bowel disease, idiopathic ulcerative jejunoileitis
- Diagnostic method: Scintigraphy, viral serologies
- Treatment: Octreotide, surgery

Protein losing enteropathy (PLE) is a syndrome in which blood proteins are lost excessively via the gastrointestinal (GI) tract. It may be caused by many different underlying diseases that damage the lining of the GI tract (mucosa) or cause blockage of its lymphatic drainage.

== Signs and symptoms ==
The signs and symptoms of protein losing enteropathy include diarrhea, fever, and general abdominal discomfort. Swelling of the legs due to peripheral edema can also occur; however, if the PLE is related to a systemic disease such as congestive heart failure or constrictive pericarditis, then these symptoms could be due directly to the underlying illness. In severe cases, anasarca, a generalized form of edema, may develop.

== Causes ==
The causes of protein-losing enteropathy can include GI conditions (among other causes), like the following:

- Inflammatory bowel disease
- Congenital heart defect (single ventricle following surgical repair resulting in congestive heart failure)
- Idiopathic ulcerative jejunoileitis
- Infection (secondary obstruction)
- Neoplasm (secondary obstruction)
- Sarcoidosis (secondary obstruction)
- Amyloidosis
- Systemic lupus erythematosus (SLE)
- Ménétrier's disease
- Zollinger-Ellison syndrome
- Eosinophilic gastroenteritis
- Coeliac disease
- Common variable immunodeficiency (CVID)
- Primary intestinal lymphangectasia

== Mechanism ==
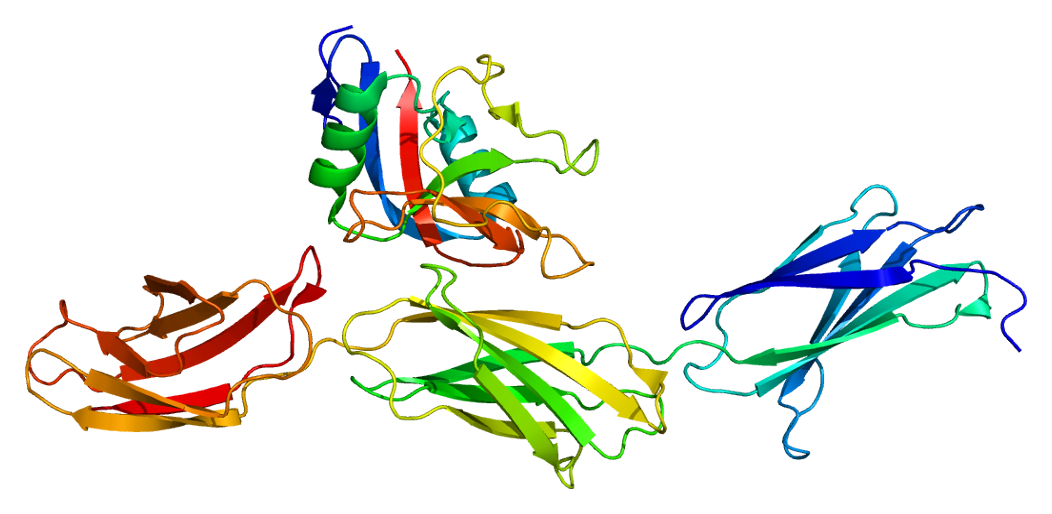
Proteoglycan

The pathophysiology of protein losing enteropathy is a result of plasma protein loss to the GI tract lumen. PLE is a complication of a disorder, be it lymphatic obstruction or mucosal injury.

Protein losing enteropathy is a syndrome characterized by many different pathophysiologic mechanisms of intestinal protein loss. Erosive disease, is characterized by mucosal damage or erosions of the colon intestinal epithelium and capillary bed underlying the epithelium, leading to a leakage of proteins from the capillaries into the interstitial space and then into the intestinal lumen where they are lost from the body. This type of inflammation may be seen in inflammatory bowel diseases, peptic ulcers and infections. A second pathological mechanism, the non-erosive type, is characterized by increased intestinal permeability causing protein to be lost from the interstitium into the intestinal lumen. This increased intestinal permeability may be seen in eosinophilic gastroenteritis and other conditions causing increased inflammation in the gut, or certain genetic disorders affecting the cell adhesions between gut enterocytes. And a third type is due to intestinal lymphangiectasia in which the lymphatic vessels that drain interstitial fluid from the gut are damaged, leading to a blockage of lymphatic drainage and a buildup of interstitial fluid near the gut, thus causing leakage of proteins into the gut. This may be due to primary or congenital disease states of the lymphatic system or secondary (acquired) damage to the lymphatic system. Possible secondary causes of lymphangiectasis include congestive heart failure or constrictive pericarditis. These conditions cause an increase in the central venous pressure. The lymphatic system drains into the central venous system following a negative pressure gradient to the subclavian vein via the thoracic duct or right lymphatic duct. However, any pathological mechanism that leads to increased central venous pressure may also cause increased lymphatic pressure, thus impairing lymphatic drainage at the gut and lead to protein losing enteropathy. Certain infections such as Whipple disease can also lead to impaired lymphatic drainage by destroying the lymphatic lacteals, which are lymphatic capillaries underlying intestinal villi and facilitating the drainage of lymph from the gut. Congenital disorders of the lymphatic system such as Primary Intestinal Lymphangiectasia are due to congenitally dilated or malformed lacteals that lead to lymph leakage into the small bowel, causing protein loss and protein losing enteropathy.

The widespread hypoproteinemia seen in protein losing enteropathy may present with complications related to the specific proteins lost, especially in severe disease. A decrease in antibodies (also known as immune globulins) may lead to an increased susceptibility to infections. And the loss of inhibitory coagulation factors may lead to a hypercoagulable state.

In pediatric protein losing enteropathy, changes in epithelial cells contribute to the pathogenesis of PLE by augmenting the rate of efflux of serum proteins. Congenital molecular mutations, poor lymphatic drainage and/or inflammation may cause epithelial matrix changes. The absence of proteoglycans, which are glycosaminoglycan chains attached to protein, may contribute to PLE and augment inflammatory cytokines. Children who have certain congenital glycosylation defects may have protein losing enteropathy.

== Diagnosis ==
The diagnosis of protein losing enteropathy is made by excluding other causes of protein loss. Endoscopy can be used to localize the cause of the protein loss in the bowel. Different methods of quantifying protein loss in the bowel include faecal excretion of alpha 1-antitrypsin, a marker of protein losing enteropathy, as well as viral serologies, which may be useful to determine the cause of the PLE. Alpha 1-antitrypsin is a blood protein that is lost in the gut, however, it is not actively secreted or absorbed by the gut, and it resists proteolysis in the gut lumen, thus making it a preferred protein for quantification of gut protein loss in protein losing enteropathy. Fecal alpha 1-antitrypsin may be quantified in a random stool sample, or more accurately, in a 24-hour stool sampling to quantify the amount of protein loss in PLE. In suspected cases of local disease, or when PLE is suspected to be due to lymph drainage abnormalities, lymphangiography may be used to localize the areas of lymphatic leakage. Imaging of the thoracic or abdominopelvic cavities may also aid in the diagnosis, possibly by identifying masses impairing lymphatic and venous drainage from the intestines and thus contributing to PLE.

== Treatment ==
Treatment for protein losing enteropathy depends upon the underlying condition; according to Rychik and Spray (2002) this could mean treatment of hypoproteinemia or of the intestinal mucosa.

For causes related to the heart, treatment for PLE after the Fontan operation treatment must be equal to the level of hypoproteinemia present. Therefore, it is useful to categorize patients based on their serum albumin levels, if less than normal (typically less than 3.5 g/dL) but greater than 2.5 g/dL, this can be seen as a mild form of protein losing enteropathy. Symptomatic management of edema with furosemide (and aldactone) can provide relief for the individual with mild hypoproteinemia.

== In animals ==
Dogs can also suffer from PLE. Because the proteins are lost from the intestine, these dogs have low levels of albumin in the blood. Chronic enteropathy is one of the possible reasons for PLE and it has been shown in a study that hypoalbuminaemia is a risk factor for negative outcome and the prognosis is guarded for these dogs. Gastrointestinal lymphoma and intestinal lymphangiectasia are other diseases that can cause protein losing enteropathy in dogs. The Breed Lundehunds seem to be predisposed for PLE.
