= Gastric folds =

Coiled sections of tissue that exist in the mucosal and submucosal layers of the stomach

- Stomach

Details

Identifiers
- Latin: plicae gastricae
- TA98: A05.5.01.028
- TA2: 2915
- FMA: 75653

The gastric folds (or gastric rugae) are coiled sections of tissue that exist in the mucosal and submucosal layers of the stomach. They provide elasticity by allowing the stomach to expand when a bolus enters it. These folds stretch outward through the action of mechanoreceptors, which respond to the increase in pressure. This allows the stomach to expand, therefore increasing the volume of the stomach without increasing pressure. They also provide the stomach with an increased surface area for nutrient absorption during digestion. Gastric folds may be seen during esophagogastroduodenoscopy or in radiological studies.

== Layers ==
The gastric folds consist of two layers:

- Mucosal layer – This layer releases stomach acid. It is the innermost layer of the stomach. It is affected by the hormone histamine, which signals it to release hydrochloric acid (HCl).
- Sub-mucosal layer – This layer consists of different vessels and nerves, ganglion neurons, and adipose tissue. It is the second layer of the stomach and supports the mucosa.

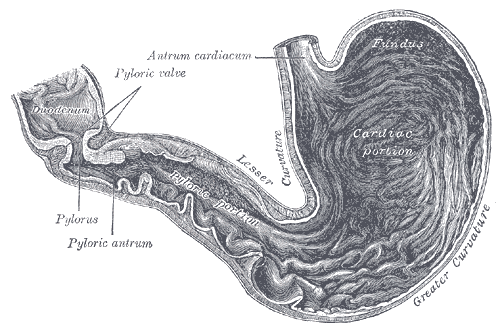
Drawing of the interior of the stomach.

== Clinical significance ==
Thickening of the gastric folds may be observed by endoscopy or radiography and may aid in the differential diagnosis of many disease processes including:

Gastritis
The folds become very thick due to inflammation.
Peptic ulcer disease
Ulcers cause breaks in the mucosa and cause erosion of the sub-mucosa.
Zollinger-Ellison syndrome
Gastrin levels increase due to tumors, which cause an increase in the gastric fold size.
Ménétrier's disease
The mucosa pits are in excess causing thickening of the folds.
Carcinoma
Helicobacter pylori infection
Causes inflammation of the folds.
Gastric syphilis
Cytomegalovirus
Mucosa change shape causing rugae enlargement.
Sarcoidosis
Causes thickening of the folds.
