= Galloway–Mowat syndrome =

- Other names: Galloway Syndrome, Hiatal Hernia–Microcephaly–Nephrosis, Galloway Type, Microcephaly–Hiatal Hernia–Nephrosis, Galloway Type, Nephrosis–Microcephaly Syndrome, Nephrosis–Neuronal Dysmigration Syndrome, Microcephaly–Hiatal Hernia–Nephrotic Syndrome
- Galloway–Mowat syndrome has an autosomal recessive pattern of inheritance.
- Frequency: 0.0005%

Galloway–Mowat syndrome is a very rare autosomal recessive genetic disorder, consisting of a variety of features including hiatal hernia, microcephaly and nephrotic syndrome.

== Cause ==
The exact genetic defect in Galloway–Mowat syndrome is yet to be discovered. However, mutations in podocyte proteins, such as nephrin, alpha-actinin 4, and podocin, are associated with proteinuria and nephrotic syndrome. There is reduced expression of synaptopodin, GLEPP1, and nephrin in Galloway–Mowat syndrome, but these are likely secondary to the proteinuria, likely not the proteins mutated in Galloway-Mowat syndrome.

The biochemical lesion appears to be in the Kinase, Endopeptidase and Other Proteins of small Size (KEOPS)/Endopeptidase-like and Kinase associated to transcribed Chromatin (EKC) (KEOPS/EKC) complex. Sequencing of genes in 37 cases of this condition revealed mutations in the OSGEP, TP53RK, TPRKB and LAGE3 genes all of which encode subunits in the KEOPS complex. Members of this complex are found in bacteria, archaea and eukaryotes and are highly conserved. The function of this complex is still under investigation.

The biochemical lesion in this condition appears to be in the N6-threonyl-carbamoylation of adenosine 37 of ANN-type tRNA pathway. This pathway uses two sequentially acting enzymes - YRDC and OSGEP. Mutations in these genes leads to this syndrome.

== Genetics ==
Galloway–Mowat syndrome is usually an autosomal recessive disorder, which means the defective gene responsible for the disorder is located on an autosome, and two copies of the defective gene (one inherited from each parent) are required in order to be born with the disorder. The parents of an individual with an autosomal recessive disorder both carry one copy of the defective gene, but usually do not experience any signs or symptoms of the disorder. Multiple genes (10 genes as of November 2026) are causal for the clinical symptoms of Galloway–Mowat syndrome. There is one gene, LAGE3, associated with X-linked inheritance of Galloway–Mowat syndrome.

The genes/subtypes listed in OMIM are: WDR73, LAGE3 (X-linked), OSGEP, TP53RK, TPRKB, WDR4, NUP107, NUP133 (provisional), GON7, and YRDC.
