= WDR73 =

Protein-coding gene found in humans

Identifiers
- Aliases: WDR73, GAMOS, HSPC264, WD repeat domain 73, GAMOS1
- External IDs: OMIM: 616144; MGI: 1919218; GeneCards: WDR73

Gene location (Human)
Chr.	Chromosome 15 (human)
Band	15q25.2	Start	84,639,285 bp
Band	15q25.2	End	84,654,343 bp

Gene location (Mouse)
Chr.	Chromosome 7 (mouse)
Band	7|7 D3	Start	80,540,471 bp
Band	7|7 D3	End	80,551,017 bp
RNA expression pattern
Bgee	Human / Mouse (ortholog); Top expressed in: right uterine tube; right lobe of thyroid gland; pituitary gland; anterior pituitary; epithelium of bronchus; bronchial epithelial cell; left lobe of thyroid gland; right adrenal gland; right adrenal cortex; left adrenal cortex / Top expressed in: otic vesicle; hand; epiblast; morula; embryo; ventricular zone; embryo; blastocyst; neural tube; primitive streak; More reference expression data
BioGPS	n/a
Gene ontology
Molecular function	molecular function
Cellular component	cytoplasm; spindle; cytoskeleton; spindle pole; cytosol; cleavage furrow
Biological process	nucleus organization; cytoplasmic microtubule organization; negative regulation of apoptotic process
Sources:Amigo / QuickGO
Orthologs
Databases	NCBI: entry; OMA: entry
Species	Human	Mouse
Entrez	84942	71968
Ensembl	ENSG00000177082	ENSMUSG00000025722
UniProt	Q6P4I2; Q5RKY8	Q9CWR1
RefSeq (mRNA)	NM_032856	NM_028026
RefSeq (protein)	NP_116245; NP_116245.2	NP_082302
Location (UCSC)	Chr 15: 84.64 – 84.65 Mb	Chr 7: 80.54 – 80.55 Mb
PubMed search
- Wikidata
View/Edit Human	View/Edit Mouse

The integrator complex assembly factor WDR73 is a protein that in humans is encoded by the gene WDR73. This protein participates in the assembly of the multi-protein complex called the integrator complex, which regulates RNA polymerase II.

== Function ==
The protein WDR73 interacts with two subunits of the integrator complex, INTS9 and INTS11, and helps them bind together to form a heterodimer through stabilization. This blocks the active site of INTS11. BRAT1 then comes and takes WDR73's place at the active site, releasing it, and subsequently importing INTS9 and INTS11 into the cell nucleus.

== Structure ==
Most of this protein consists of 6 WD40 repeat domains. This type of domain is common in scaffold proteins and often participates in protein-protein or protein-RNA interactions.

== Medical significance ==
Pathogenic mutations in WDR73 is associated with a neurodegenerative disorder called type 1 Galloway-Mowat syndrome (GAMOS1). Symptoms can include microcephaly, various forms of brain atrophy, and movement disorders. It is inherited in an autosomal recessive manner.
