= KIRREL3 =

Protein-coding gene in the species Homo sapiens

Identifiers
- Aliases: KIRREL3, KIRRE, MRD4, NEPH2, PRO4502, kin of IRRE like 3 (Drosophila), Kin of IRRE-like protein 3, kirre like nephrin family adhesion molecule 3
- External IDs: OMIM: 607761; MGI: 1914953; GeneCards: KIRREL3
Available structures
PDB	Ortholog search: PDBe RCSB
PDB	List of PDB id codes 2CRY

Gene location (Human)
Chr.	Chromosome 11 (human)
Band	11q24.2	Start	126,423,358 bp
Band	11q24.2	End	127,003,460 bp

Gene location (Mouse)
Chr.	Chromosome 9 (mouse)
Band	9|9 A4	Start	34,485,894 bp
Band	9|9 A4	End	35,036,716 bp
RNA expression pattern
Bgee	Human / Mouse (ortholog); Top expressed in: middle temporal gyrus; nucleus accumbens; Brodmann area 23; prefrontal cortex; right frontal lobe; caudate nucleus; putamen; Brodmann area 9; endothelial cell; C1 segment / Top expressed in: Rostral migratory stream; lobe of cerebellum; cerebellar vermis; nucleus accumbens; substantia nigra; lumbar subsegment of spinal cord; hand; dentate gyrus of hippocampal formation granule cell; inferior colliculi; otolith organ; More reference expression data
BioGPS	n/a
Gene ontology
Molecular function	protein binding
Cellular component	dendritic shaft; integral component of membrane; extracellular region; axon; plasma membrane; membrane; dendrite
Biological process	neuron projection morphogenesis; neuron migration; inter-male aggressive behavior; principal sensory nucleus of trigeminal nerve development; glomerulus morphogenesis; hippocampus development; homophilic cell adhesion via plasma membrane adhesion molecules; synapse assembly; hemopoiesis
Sources:Amigo / QuickGO
Orthologs
Databases	NCBI: entry; OMA: entry
Species	Human	Mouse
Entrez	84623	67703
Ensembl	ENSG00000149571	ENSMUSG00000032036
UniProt	Q8IZU9	Q8BR86
RefSeq (mRNA)	NM_001161707; NM_001301097; NM_032531	NM_001190911; NM_001190912; NM_001190913; NM_001190914; NM_026324
RefSeq (protein)	NP_001155179; NP_001288026; NP_115920	NP_001177840; NP_001177841; NP_001177842; NP_001177843; NP_080600
Location (UCSC)	Chr 11: 126.42 – 127 Mb	Chr 9: 34.49 – 35.04 Mb
PubMed search
- Wikidata
View/Edit Human	View/Edit Mouse

Kin of IRRE-like protein 3 (KIRREL3) also known as kin of irregular chiasm-like protein 3 or NEPH2 is a protein that in humans is encoded by the KIRREL3 gene.

NEPH2 is a member of the NEPH protein family of transmembrane proteins, which includes NEPH1 (KIRREL) and NEPH3 (KIRREL2). The NEPH proteins can interact with nephrin and CASK.

== Function ==
NEPH2 has been implicated in synapse formation. Disruption of KIRREL3 gene function had been associated with abnormal brain function.

NEPH1 and NEPH2 are involved in the blood filtration function of the kidney and are located in the slit diaphragm.
