= KIRREL1 =

Protein-coding gene in humans

Identifiers
- Aliases: KIRREL1, NEPH1, KIRREL, kin of IRRE like (Drosophila), Kin of IRRE-like protein 1, kirre like nephrin family adhesion molecule 1, NPHS23
- External IDs: OMIM: 607428; MGI: 1891396; GeneCards: KIRREL1
Available structures
PDB	Ortholog search: PDBe RCSB
PDB	List of PDB id codes 4OFD

Gene location (Human)
Chr.	Chromosome 1 (human)
Band	1q23.1	Start	157,993,273 bp
Band	1q23.1	End	158,100,262 bp

Gene location (Mouse)
Chr.	Chromosome 3 (mouse)
Band	3|3 F1	Start	86,985,900 bp
Band	3|3 F1	End	87,082,054 bp
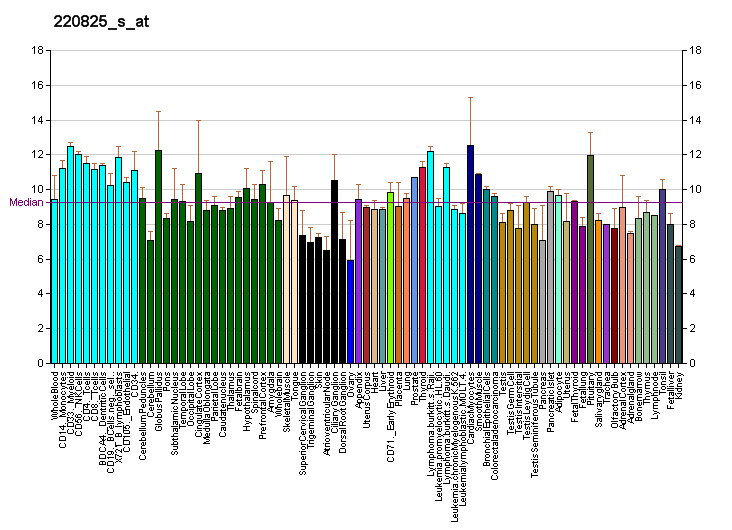
RNA expression pattern
Bgee	Human / Mouse (ortholog); Top expressed in: stromal cell of endometrium; right coronary artery; Descending thoracic aorta; popliteal artery; tibial arteries; ascending aorta; gallbladder; left coronary artery; left uterine tube; right ovary / Top expressed in: calvaria; molar; umbilical cord; stroma of bone marrow; epithelium of lens; hand; body of femur; endothelial cell of lymphatic vessel; vas deferens; foot; More reference expression data
BioGPS	More reference expression data
Gene ontology
Molecular function	myosin binding; protein binding
Cellular component	dendritic shaft; integral component of membrane; perinuclear region of cytoplasm; membrane raft; plasma membrane; membrane; cell projection membrane; cell-cell junction
Biological process	negative regulation of protein phosphorylation; excretion; positive regulation of actin filament polymerization; cell-cell adhesion
Sources:Amigo / QuickGO
Orthologs
Databases	NCBI: entry; OMA: entry
Species	Human	Mouse
Entrez	55243	170643
Ensembl	ENSG00000183853	ENSMUSG00000041734
UniProt	Q96J84	Q80W68
RefSeq (mRNA)	NM_001286349; NM_018240	NM_001170985; NM_130867; NM_001377046
RefSeq (protein)	NP_001273278; NP_060710	NP_001164456; NP_570937; NP_001363975
Location (UCSC)	Chr 1: 157.99 – 158.1 Mb	Chr 3: 86.99 – 87.08 Mb
PubMed search
- Wikidata
View/Edit Human	View/Edit Mouse

Kin of IRRE-like protein 1, also known as NEPH1, is a protein that in humans is encoded by the KIRREL1 gene (previously KIRREL).

== Function ==
NEPH1 is a member of the NEPH protein family, which includes NEPH2 (KIRREL3, MIM 607761) and NEPH3 (KIRREL2, MIM 607762). The cytoplasmic domains of these proteins interact with the C terminus of podocin (NPHS2; MIM 604766). NEPH1 is expressed in filtration slits of kidney podocytes, cells involved in ensuring size- and charge-selective ultrafiltration of blood (Sellin et al., 2003). [supplied by OMIM]

== Interactions ==
KIRREL1 has been shown to interact with Nephrin and Tight junction protein 1.
