= Karl Tryggvason =

Karl Tryggvason (born March 17, 1947) is an Icelandic medical researcher.

== Biography ==
Karl Tryggvason was born in Reykjavík. He trained as a medical doctor at Finland's University of Oulu, where he graduated with an M.D. in 1975 and with a Ph.D. in 1977 with doctoral dissertation Glomeruli and their basement membrane in the normal human kidney and in congenital nephrotic syndrome of the Finnish type. At the University of Oulu for the academic years from 1974 to 1978 and in 1979, he was an assistant in the medical biochemistry department. For the academic year 1978–1979 he was a visiting associate at the NIH's National Institute of Dental Research (now called the National Institute of Dental and Craniofacial Research) in Bethesda, Maryland. For the academic year 1979–1980 he was an assistant of clinical chemistry in the resident program of the University Hospital of Oulu. For the academic year 1983–1984 he was a visiting associate professor of biochemistry and clinical pathology at Rutgers New Jersey Medical School. From 1986 to 1989 he was a senior investigator in the Academy of Finland. From 1987 to 1995 he was a professor of biochemistry and chair of the biochemistry department of the University of Oulu's Faculty of Science — during those year he was also from 1989 to 1994 a research professor at The Finnish Cancer Institute (located the University of Oulu). Karl Tryggvason was appointed in 1994 a professor of medical chemistry in the Karolinska Institute's Department of Biochemistry and Biophysics and in 2012 the Tanoto Professor in Diabetes Research at Singapore's Duke–NUS Medical School. He is a member of the Nobel Assembly at the Karolinska Institute as a member of the Nobel Committee for physiology and medicine. He was in 1986 one of the founders of Biocenter Oulu, Finland's first elite center in biomedical research, which became a biomedical research model for other Finnish universities.

His research focuses on the basement membranes, which interface between the overlying epithelial tissues and the underlying connective tissue. The research group under his leadership has identified and developed diagnostics for five serious genetic diseases, caused by mutations in genes for proteins that build up the human body's basement membrane.

His research concerns the molecular composition, biology and diseases of basement membranes (BM), a special compartment of the extracellular matrix. His group has cloned almost all human BM proteins and clarified genetic causes of many BM-associated diseases, such as Alport and congenital nephrotic syndromes, junctional epidermolysis bullosa and congenital muscular dystrophy. He has studied matrix metalloproteinases, discovered MMP-2 and determined its crystal structure ... His group has produced most laminins as recombinant human proteins and recently the group has shown that different laminin isoforms influence stem cell growth and differentiation. His group has developed fully human and chemically defined laminin-based methods for generation of stem cell derived cardiomyocytes, retina RPE and photoreceptors, keratinocytes and pancreatic islet cells. Currently, the group works on the development stem cell derived cells for regenerative medicine.

Karl Tryggvason is the author or co-author of more than 400 research articles. In 2008 he was the co-founder of BioLamina AB, a Swedish biotechnology company that produces laminins for cell therapy and research in cell biology.

He was elected in 1992 a member of the Finnish Academy of Science and Letters and was appointed in 2001 an Honorary Doctor of the University of Iceland. He received in 1995 the University of Oulu's Professor Pentti Kaiser Award, in 2000 the American Society of Nephrology's Homer W. Smith Award, and in 2002 the Fondation Louis-Jeantet's Louis-Jeantet Prize for Medicine. In 2005 he was elected a member of Academia Europaea and a foreign member of the Royal Swedish Academy of Sciences.

== Selected publications ==
- Liotta, L. A.; Tryggvason, K.; Garbisa, S.; Hart, Ian; Foltz, C. M.; Shafie, S. (1980). "Metastatic potential correlates with enzymatic degradation of basement membrane collagen". Nature. 284 (5751): 67–68. Bibcode:1980Natur.284...67L. doi:10.1038/284067a0. PMID 6243750. S2CID 4356057.
- Kleinman, Hynda K.; McGarvey, Mary L.; Liotta, Lance A.; Robey, Pamela Gehron; Tryggvason, Karl; Martin, George R. (1982). "Isolation and characterization of type IV procollagen, laminin, and heparan sulfate proteoglycan from the EHS sarcoma". Biochemistry. 21 (24): 6188–6193. doi:10.1021/bi00267a025. PMID 6217835.
- Tryggvason, K.; Höyhtyä, M.; Salo, T. (1987). "Proteolytic degradation of extracellular matrix in tumor invasion". Biochimica et Biophysica Acta (BBA) - Reviews on Cancer. 907 (3): 191–217. doi:10.1016/0304-419X(87)90006-0. PMID 2823896.
- Barker, David F.; Hostikka, Sirkka Liisa; Zhou, Jing; Chow, Louise T.; Oliphant, Arnold R.; Gerken, Steven C.; Gregory, Martin C.; Skolnick, Mark H.; Atkin, Curtis L.; Tryggvason, Karl (1990). "Identification of Mutations in the COL4A5 Collagen Gene in Alport Syndrome". Science. 248 (4960): 1224–1227. Bibcode:1990Sci...248.1224B. doi:10.1126/science.2349482. PMID 2349482.
- Burgeson, Robert E.; Chiquet, Matthias; Deutzmann, Rainer; Ekblom, Peter; Engel, Jürgen; Kleinman, Hynda; Martin, George R.; Meneguzzi, Guerrino; Paulsson, Mats; Sanes, Joshua; Timpl, Rupert; Tryggvason, Karl; Yamada, Yoshihiko; Yurchenco, Peter D. (1994). "A new nomenclature for the laminins". Matrix Biology. 14 (3): 209–211. doi:10.1016/0945-053X(94)90184-8. PMID 7921537.
- Helbling-Leclerc, Anne; Zhang, Xu; Topaloglu, Haluk; Cruaud, Corinne; Tesson, Frédérique; Weissenbach, Jean; Tomé, Fernando M.S.; Schwartz, Ketty; Fardeau, Michel; Tryggvason, Karl; Guicheney, Pascale (1995). "Mutations in the laminin α2–chain gene (LAMA2) cause merosin–deficient congenital muscular dystrophy". Nature Genetics. 11 (2): 216–218. doi:10.1038/ng1095-216. PMID 7550355. S2CID 34969060.
- Kestilä, Marjo; Lenkkeri, Ulla; Männikkö, Minna; Lamerdin, Jane; McCready, Paula; Putaala, Heli; Ruotsalainen, Vesa; Morita, Takako; Nissinen, Marja; Herva, Riitta; Kashtan, Clifford E.; Peltonen, Leena; Holmberg, Christer; Olsen, Anne; Tryggvason, Karl (1998). "Positionally Cloned Gene for a Novel Glomerular Protein—Nephrin—Is Mutated in Congenital Nephrotic Syndrome". Molecular Cell. 1 (4): 575–582. doi:10.1016/S1097-2765(00)80057-X. PMID 9660941.
- Ruotsalainen, V.; Ljungberg, P.; Wartiovaara, J.; Lenkkeri, U.; Kestila, M.; Jalanko, H.; Holmberg, C.; Tryggvason, K. (1999). "Nephrin is specifically located at the slit diaphragm of glomerular podocytes". Proceedings of the National Academy of Sciences. 96 (14): 7962–7967. Bibcode:1999PNAS...96.7962R. doi:10.1073/pnas.96.14.7962. PMC 22170. PMID 10393930.
- Zhou, Z.; Apte, S. S.; Soininen, R.; Cao, R.; Baaklini, G. Y.; Rauser, R. W.; Wang, J.; Cao, Y.; Tryggvason, K. (2000). "Impaired endochondral ossification and angiogenesis in mice deficient in membrane-type matrix metalloproteinase I". Proceedings of the National Academy of Sciences. 97 (8): 4052–4057. Bibcode:2000PNAS...97.4052Z. doi:10.1073/pnas.060037197. PMC 18145. PMID 10737763.
- Jais, Jean Philippe; Knebelmann, Bertrand; Giatras, Iannis; Marchi, Mario DE; Rizzoni, Gianfranco; Renieri, Alessandra; Weber, Manfred; Gross, Oliver; Netzer, KAI-Olaf; Flinter, Frances; Pirson, Yves; Verellen, Christine; Wieslander, Jörgen; Persson, ULF; Tryggvason, Karl; Martin, Paula; Hertz, Jens Michael; Schröder, Cornelis; Sanak, Marek; Krejcova, Sarka; Carvalho, Maria Fernanda; Saus, Juan; Antignac, Corinne; Smeets, Hubert; Gubler, Marie Claire (2000). "X-linked Alport Syndrome". Journal of the American Society of Nephrology. 11 (4): 649–657. doi:10.1681/ASN.V114649. PMID 10752524.
- Patarroyo, Manuel; Tryggvason, Karl; Virtanen, Ismo (2002). "Laminin isoforms in tumor invasion, angiogenesis and metastasis". Seminars in Cancer Biology. 12 (3): 197–207. doi:10.1016/S1044-579X(02)00023-8. PMID 12083850.
- Pendás, Alberto M.; Zhou, Zhongjun; Cadiñanos, Juan; Freije, José M.P.; Wang, Jianming; Hultenby, Kjell; Astudillo, Aurora; Wernerson, Annika; Rodríguez, Francisco; Tryggvason, Karl; López-Otín, Carlos (2002). "Defective prelamin a processing and muscular and adipocyte alterations in Zmpste24 metalloproteinase–deficient mice". Nature Genetics. 31 (1): 94–99. doi:10.1038/ng871. PMID 11923874. S2CID 11413606.
- Hudson, Billy G.; Tryggvason, Karl; Sundaramoorthy, Munirathinam; Neilson, Eric G. (2003). "Alport's Syndrome, Goodpasture's Syndrome, and Type IV Collagen". New England Journal of Medicine. 348 (25): 2543–2556. doi:10.1056/NEJMra022296. PMID 12815141.
- Liu, Baohua; Wang, Jianming; Chan, Kui Ming; Tjia, Wai Mui; Deng, Wen; Guan, Xinyuan; Huang, Jian-Dong; Li, Kai Man; Chau, Pui Yin; Chen, David J.; Pei, Duanqing; Pendas, Alberto M.; Cadiñanos, Juan; López-Otín, Carlos; Tse, Hung Fat; Hutchison, Chris; Chen, Junjie; Cao, Yihai; Cheah, Kathryn S E.; Tryggvason, Karl; Zhou, Zhongjun (2005). "Genomic instability in laminopathy-based premature aging". Nature Medicine. 11 (7): 780–785. doi:10.1038/nm1266. PMID 15980864. S2CID 11798376.
- Aumailley, M.; et al. (2005). "A simplified laminin nomenclature". Matrix Biology. 24 (5): 326–332. doi:10.1016/j.matbio.2005.05.006. PMID 15979864.
- Rodin, Sergey; Domogatskaya, Anna; Ström, Susanne; Hansson, Emil M.; Chien, Kenneth R.; Inzunza, José; Hovatta, Outi; Tryggvason, Karl (2010). "Long-term self-renewal of human pluripotent stem cells on human recombinant laminin-511". Nature Biotechnology. 28 (6): 611–615. doi:10.1038/nbt.1620. PMID 20512123. S2CID 10801152.
