= KIRREL2 =

Protein-coding gene in the species Homo sapiens

Identifiers
- Aliases: KIRREL2, FILTRIN, NEPH3, NLG1, kin of IRRE like 2 (Drosophila), kirre like nephrin family adhesion molecule 2
- External IDs: OMIM: 607762; MGI: 2442334; GeneCards: KIRREL2

Gene location (Human)
Chr.	Chromosome 19 (human)
Band	19q13.12	Start	35,855,861 bp
Band	19q13.12	End	35,867,136 bp

Gene location (Mouse)
Chr.	Chromosome 7 (mouse)
Band	7|7 B1	Start	30,146,959 bp
Band	7|7 B1	End	30,157,115 bp
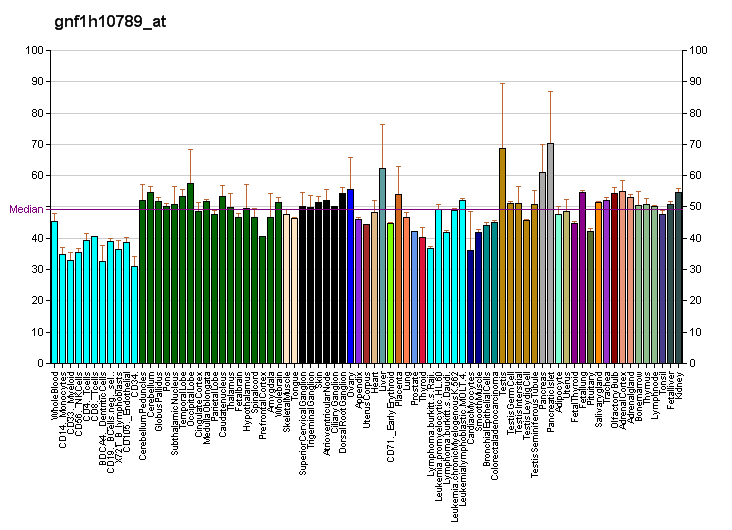
RNA expression pattern
Bgee	Human / Mouse (ortholog); Top expressed in: body of pancreas; islet of Langerhans; ventricular zone; ganglionic eminence; retinal pigment epithelium; prefrontal cortex; external globus pallidus; lymph node; Brodmann area 9; cingulate gyrus / Top expressed in: primary visual cortex; superior frontal gyrus; dentate gyrus of hippocampal formation granule cell; white matter of cerebellum; respiratory epithelium; striatum of neuraxis; islet of Langerhans; spinal cord; nasal epithelium; rhombic lip; More reference expression data
BioGPS	More reference expression data
Gene ontology
Molecular function	protein binding; identical protein binding
Cellular component	integral component of membrane; slit diaphragm; membrane; plasma membrane; cell-cell junction
Biological process	negative regulation of protein phosphorylation; cell adhesion; cell-cell adhesion
Sources:Amigo / QuickGO
Orthologs
Databases	NCBI: entry; OMA: entry
Species	Human	Mouse
Entrez	84063	243911
Ensembl	ENSG00000126259	ENSMUSG00000036915
UniProt	Q6UWL6	Q7TSU7
RefSeq (mRNA)	NM_032123; NM_199179; NM_199180; NM_001329530; NM_001363667	NM_172898
RefSeq (protein)	NP_001316459; NP_115499; NP_954648; NP_954649; NP_001350596	NP_766486
Location (UCSC)	Chr 19: 35.86 – 35.87 Mb	Chr 7: 30.15 – 30.16 Mb
PubMed search
- Wikidata
View/Edit Human	View/Edit Mouse

Kin of IRRE-like protein 2, also known as NEPH3, is a protein that in humans is encoded by the KIRREL2 gene. It is primarily expressed in β cells of the pancreatic islets.

KIRREL2 is a member of the NEPH protein family, which includes NEPH1 (KIRREL) and NEPH2 (KIRREL3).
