= CD2AP =

Protein

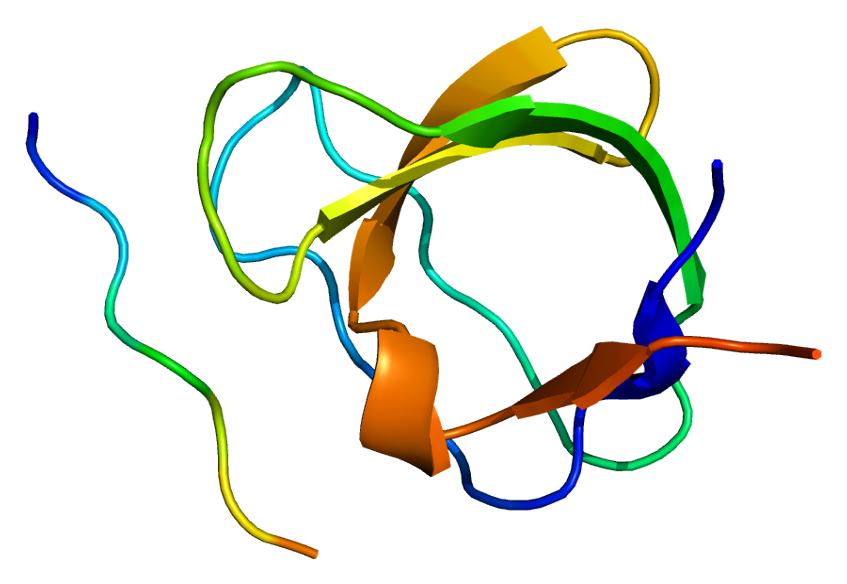

Identifiers
- Aliases: CD2AP, CMS, CD2-associated protein, CD2 associated protein
- External IDs: OMIM: 604241; MGI: 1330281; GeneCards: CD2AP
Available structures
PDB	Ortholog search: PDBe RCSB
PDB	List of PDB id codes 2FEI, 2J6F, 2J6K, 2J6O, 2J7I, 3AA6, 3LK4, 3U23, 4WCI, 4X1V

Gene location (Human)
Chr.	Chromosome 6 (human)
Band	6p12.3	Start	47,477,789 bp
Band	6p12.3	End	47,627,263 bp

Gene location (Mouse)
Chr.	Chromosome 17 (mouse)
Band	17|17 B3	Start	43,103,842 bp
Band	17|17 B3	End	43,187,556 bp
RNA expression pattern
Bgee	Human / Mouse (ortholog); Top expressed in: jejunal mucosa; mucosa of colon; mucosa of sigmoid colon; duodenum; rectum; glomerulus; amniotic fluid; metanephric glomerulus; oral cavity; germinal epithelium / Top expressed in: gastrula; gastric mucosa; mucous cell of stomach; renal corpuscle; epithelium of stomach; medullary collecting duct; urothelium; decidua; aortic valve; secondary oocyte; More reference expression data
BioGPS	n/a
Gene ontology
Molecular function	beta-catenin binding; SH3 domain binding; protein-containing complex binding; structural constituent of cytoskeleton; protein C-terminus binding; protein binding; vascular endothelial growth factor receptor binding; cadherin binding
Cellular component	filamentous actin; cell projection; cell-cell junction; ruffle; endocytic vesicle; cell leading edge; actin cytoskeleton; perinuclear region of cytoplasm; extracellular exosome; cytoskeleton; cytoplasm; plasma membrane; cell junction; protein-containing complex
Biological process	regulation of actin cytoskeleton reorganization; negative regulation of transforming growth factor beta1 production; vesicle organization; substrate-dependent cell migration, cell extension; cell division; cell cycle; cell migration; regulation of receptor-mediated endocytosis; signal transduction; proteasome-mediated ubiquitin-dependent protein catabolic process; positive regulation of protein localization to nucleus; actin filament organization; negative regulation of small GTPase mediated signal transduction; cell-cell adhesion; protein-containing complex assembly; positive regulation of protein secretion
Sources:Amigo / QuickGO
Orthologs
Databases	NCBI: entry; OMA: entry
Species	Human	Mouse
Entrez	23607	12488
Ensembl	ENSG00000198087	ENSMUSG00000061665
UniProt	Q9Y5K6	Q9JLQ0
RefSeq (mRNA)	NM_012120	NM_009847
RefSeq (protein)	NP_036252	NP_033977
Location (UCSC)	Chr 6: 47.48 – 47.63 Mb	Chr 17: 43.1 – 43.19 Mb
PubMed search
- Wikidata
View/Edit Human	View/Edit Mouse

CD2-associated protein is a protein that in humans is encoded by the CD2AP gene.

== Function ==
This gene encodes a scaffolding molecule that regulates the actin cytoskeleton. The protein directly interacts with filamentous actin and a variety of cell membrane proteins through multiple actin binding sites, SH3 domains, and a proline-rich region containing binding sites for SH3 domains. The cytoplasmic protein localizes to membrane ruffles, lipid rafts, and the leading edges of cells. It is implicated in dynamic actin remodeling and membrane trafficking that occurs during receptor endocytosis and cytokinesis. Haploinsufficiency of this gene is implicated in susceptibility to glomerular disease.

== Interactions ==
CD2AP has been shown to interact with:

- Cbl gene,
- NPHS2,
- Nephrin, and
- RAB4A.

== See also ==
- Focal segmental glomerulosclerosis
