= WDR4 =

Protein-coding gene in humans

Identifiers
- Aliases: WDR4, TRM82, TRMT82, WD repeat domain 4, GAMOS6, MIGSB, hWH, Wuho
- External IDs: OMIM: 605924; MGI: 1889002; GeneCards: WDR4
Available structures
| PDB | Ortholog search: PDBe RCSB |
| PDB | List of PDB id codes 3CKK |

Gene location (Human)
| Chr. | Chromosome 21 (human) |
| Band | 21q22.3 | Start | 42,843,094 bp |
| Band | 21q22.3 | End | 42,879,568 bp |

Gene location (Mouse)
| Chr. | Chromosome 17 (mouse) |
| Band | 17|17 B1 | Start | 31,713,296 bp |
| Band | 17|17 B1 | End | 31,738,954 bp |
RNA expression pattern
| Bgee | Human / Mouse (ortholog); Top expressed in: gingival epithelium; mucosa of transverse colon; gonad; gastrocnemius muscle; pancreatic ductal cell; testicle; stromal cell of endometrium; body of pancreas; vagina; ganglionic eminence / Top expressed in: epiblast; yolk sac; embryo; embryo; ventricular zone; primitive streak; granulocyte; lens; morula; blastocyst; More reference expression data |
| BioGPS | n/a |
Gene ontology
| Molecular function | tRNA (guanine-N7-)-methyltransferase activity; protein binding |
| Cellular component | nucleoplasm; nucleus; cytosol; tRNA methyltransferase complex |
| Biological process | RNA (guanine-N7)-methylation; tRNA modification; tRNA processing; tRNA (guanine-N7)-methylation; tRNA methylation |
Sources:Amigo / QuickGO
Orthologs
| Databases | NCBI: entry; OMA: entry |
| Species | Human | Mouse |
| Entrez | 10785 | 57773 |
| Ensembl | ENSG00000160193 | ENSMUSG00000024037 |
| UniProt | P57081 | Q9EP82 |
| RefSeq (mRNA) | NM_001260474; NM_001260475; NM_001260476; NM_001260477; NM_018669 NM_033661 | NM_021322 |
| RefSeq (protein) | NP_001247403; NP_001247404; NP_001247405; NP_001247406; NP_061139 NP_387510 | NP_067297 |
| Location (UCSC) | Chr 21: 42.84 – 42.88 Mb | Chr 17: 31.71 – 31.74 Mb |
| PubMed search |
- Wikidata
| View/Edit Human | View/Edit Mouse |

tRNA (guanine-N(7)-)-methyltransferase subunit WDR4 is an enzyme subunit that in humans is encoded by the WDR4 gene. This protein is a non-enzyme subunit of the METTL1-WDR4 complex which acts as a methyltransferase that produces N7-methylguanine in RNAs like tRNAs, mRNAs and microRNAs. In this complex, WDR4 functions as a scaffold for binding with tRNA.

== Structure/family ==
This gene encodes a member of the WD repeat protein family. WD repeats are minimally conserved regions of approximately 40 amino acids typically bracketed by Gly-His and Trp-Asp (GH-WD), which may facilitate formation of heterotrimeric or multiprotein complexes. Members of this family are involved in a variety of cellular processes, including cell cycle progression, signal transduction, apoptosis, and gene regulation.

== Medical significance ==
Pathogenic mutations in WDR4 have been associated with defects in brain development. Two separate forms have been observed, designated Galloway-Mowat syndrome-6 (GAMOS6) and microcephaly, growth deficiency, seizures, and brain malformations (MIGSB). Both appear to follow an autosomal recessive inheritance pattern.

This gene is excluded as a candidate for a form of nonsyndromic deafness (DFNB10).
