= Congenital nephrotic syndrome =

- Specialty: Nephrology

Congenital nephrotic syndrome is a rare kidney disease which manifests in infants during the first 3 months of life, and is characterized by high levels of protein in the urine (proteinuria), low levels of protein in the blood, and swelling. This disease is primarily caused by genetic mutations which result in damage to components of the glomerular filtration barrier and allow for leakage of plasma proteins into the urinary space.

== Signs and symptoms ==
Urine protein loss leads to total body swelling (generalized edema) and abdominal distension in the first several weeks to months of life. Fluid retention may lead to cough (from pulmonary edema), ascites, and widened cranial sutures and fontanelles. High urine protein loss can lead to foamy appearance of urine. Infants may be born prematurely with low birth weight, and have meconium stained amniotic fluid or a large placenta.

=== Complications ===
- Frequent, severe infections: urinary loss of immunoglobulins
- Malnutrition and poor growth
- Blood clots (hypercoagulability): imbalance of plasma coagulation factors from urine protein loss
- Hypothyroidism: urinary loss of thyroid-binding protein
- Poor bone health associated with vitamin D deficiency: urinary loss of vitamin D binding protein
- Acute kidney injury
- Chronic kidney disease and ultimately end-stage kidney disease

== Causes ==
=== Primary (genetic) causes ===
Mutations in the following five genes account for greater than 80% of the genetic causes of congenital nephrotic syndrome:

- NPHS1 (Finnish Type): The gene NPHS1 encodes for the protein nephrin. This genetic variant is characterized by severe protein loss in the first several days to weeks of life. Fin-major and Fin-minor were the first two main genetic mutations identified in Finnish newborns, however, numerous mutations have now been identified in patients all over the world from various ethnic groups. NPHS1 mutations are the most common cause of primary congenital nephrotic syndrome, accounting for 40-80% of cases.
- NPHS2: This gene encodes for the protein podocin. Patients with this genetic mutation develop nephrotic syndrome in the first few weeks of infancy, but can also manifest symptoms later in life. Urinary protein loss is less severe when compared with the Finnish type. Both nephrin and podocin play important roles in the structure and function of the podocyte filtration slit diaphragm and disease involvement is typically limited to the kidneys
- WT1: The Wilms' tumor suppressor gene regulates the expression of many genes involved in kidney and urogenital development. Mutations lead to several types of developmental syndromes, including Denys-Drash syndrome, Frasier syndrome, WAGR syndrome (Wilms tumor, aniridia, genitourinary abnormalities, and intellectual disability), and isolated nephrotic syndrome in infants. Depending on the specific syndrome, patients are at risk for Wilms' and other tumors, genital abnormalities, and nephrotic syndrome.
- LAMβ2 (Pierson syndrome): This gene encodes for the protein laminin β2, which helps attach podocytes to the glomerular basement membrane. Patients with Pierson syndrome have eye abnormalities, including nonreactive narrowing of the pupils (microcoria), and neurologic deficits.
- PLCε1: Codes for the enzyme Phospholipase Cε1, which is expressed in podocytes.

=== Secondary Causes ===
- Congenital infections: syphilis, cytomegalovirus, toxoplasmosis, rubella, human immunodeficiency virus (HIV), malaria, hepatitis B
- Immunologic: maternal systemic lupus erythematosus

== Diagnosis ==
An examination reveals massive fluid retention and generalized swelling. Abnormal sounds are heard when listening to the heart and lungs with a stethoscope. Blood pressure may be high. The patient may have signs of malnutrition.

A urinalysis reveals large amounts of protein and sometimes small amounts of blood in the urine. Kidney function may be normal in the first weeks or months of life. Laboratory studies show low serum levels of protein (albumin) and immunoglobulins, and elevated levels of triglycerides and cholesterol. Blood work may also show thyroid and vitamin D deficiency. Kidneys on ultrasound imaging may appear enlarged and brighter (hyperechoic). The disorder can be screened during pregnancy by finding elevated levels of alpha-fetoprotein on a routine sampling of amniotic fluid.

Indication for kidney biopsy remains unclear as histologic findings do no reveal the cause of congenital nephrotic syndrome, but findings may help in developing treatment strategies. Findings on light microscopy can vary from minimal change nephropathy to focal segmental glomerulosclerosis or diffuse mesangial sclerosis. Electron microscopy shows podocyte disruption (loss of podocyte foot processes or slit diaphragm).

Genetic analysis and infectious workup are needed to determine the precise cause of congenital nephrotic syndrome. Understanding the underlying cause can assist in disease management, prognosis, and genetic counseling.

== Treatment ==
Genetic forms of nephrotic syndrome are typically resistant to steroid and other immunosuppressive treatment. Goals of therapy are to control urinary protein loss and swelling, provide good nutrition to allow the child to grow, and prevent complications. Early and aggressive treatment is required to control the disorder.

Patients with severe urine protein loss require albumin infusions help replace protein loss and diuretic medications help rid the body of excess fluid. For patients with mild to moderate urine protein losses, ACE inhibitor medications (like Captopril and others) and non-steroidal anti-inflammatory drugs (like indomethacin) are used to slow the spilling of protein (albumin) in the urine. Removal of the kidneys (one at the time or both) can decrease protein loss and limit the number of albumin infusions needed. Infants with WT1 mutations will undergo bilateral kidney removal to prevent development of Wilms' tumor.

Antibiotics may be needed to control infections. Immunizations are recommended after kidney removal but prior to transplantation. Patients may also take iron supplements, potassium chloride, thyroxine and other vitamins to replenish what minerals the kidneys have leaked out. Anticoagulants (such as aspirin, dipyridamole, and warfarin) are used to prevent clot formation.

Dietary modifications may include the restriction of sodium and use of dietary supplements as appropriate for the nature and extent of malnutrition. Fluids may be restricted to help control swelling. Children with this disease require diets high in calories and protein, and many patients require a feeding tube (nasogastric tube or gastrostomy tube (g-tube)) for medication and/or feeds. Some patients develop oral aversions and will use the tube for all feeds. Other patients eat well and only use the tube for medicine or supplemental feeds. The tube is also useful for patients needing to drink large amounts of fluids around the time of transplant.

While infants with infectious causes of congenital nephrotic syndrome may improve with antibiotics or antiviral medications, those with genetic causes progress to end-stage renal disease and require dialysis, and ultimately a kidney transplant.

== Prognosis ==
Congenital nephrotic syndrome can be successfully controlled with early diagnosis and aggressive treatment including albumin infusions, nephrectomy, and medications. Affected children have rapid decline in kidney function resulting in end-stage renal disease within the first years of life, and require treatment with dialysis and kidney transplantation. Most children live fairly normal life post-transplant but will spend significant time hospitalised pre-transplant and have numerous surgeries to facilitate treatment. Kidney transplantation outcomes for children with congenital nephrotic syndrome are similar to those of other patient groups. Nephrotic syndrome typically does not reoccur following kidney transplantation, however recurrences have been seen in children with NPHS1 mutations who develop anti-nephrin antibodies.

Due to the protein (albumin) losses many patients have reduced muscle tone and may experience delays in certain physical milestones such as sitting, crawling and walking. Similarly many patients experience growth delays due to protein loss. Delays vary from mild to significant but most patients experience growth spurts once they receive their transplanted kidney. Physical therapy may be useful for the child to strengthen muscle tone. Children who have a history of stroke from thrombotic complications can have neurologic delays.

Undiagnosed cases are often fatal in the first year due to blood clots, infections or other complications.
