= OSGEP =

Protein-coding gene in the species Homo sapiens

Identifiers
- Aliases: OSGEP, Osgep, 1500019L24Rik, GCPL-1, PRSMG1, GCPL1, KAE1, OSGEP1, O-sialoglycoprotein endopeptidase, TCS3, GAMOS3
- External IDs: OMIM: 610107; MGI: 1913496; GeneCards: OSGEP
Enzyme activity
| EC # | BRENDA | ExPASy | KEGG | MetaCyc |
|---|---|---|---|---|
| 2.3.1.234 | ↗ | ↗ | ↗ | ↗ |

Gene location (Human)
| Chr. | Chromosome 14 (human) |
| Band | 14q11.2 | Start | 20,446,401 bp |
| Band | 14q11.2 | End | 20,455,089 bp |

Gene location (Mouse)
| Chr. | Chromosome 14 (mouse) |
| Band | 14|14 C1 | Start | 51,143,935 bp |
| Band | 14|14 C1 | End | 51,162,350 bp |
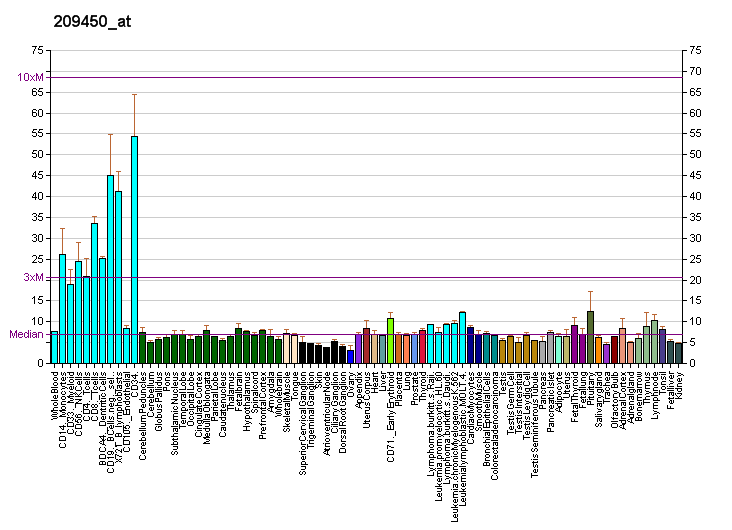
RNA expression pattern
| Bgee | Human / Mouse (ortholog); Top expressed in: right hemisphere of cerebellum; anterior pituitary; right lobe of thyroid gland; granulocyte; left lobe of thyroid gland; right uterine tube; right ovary; left ovary; right frontal lobe; canal of the cervix / Top expressed in: interventricular septum; ventricular zone; neural layer of retina; muscle of thigh; maxillary prominence; mandibular prominence; neural tube; endocardial cushion; somite; epiblast; More reference expression data |
| BioGPS | More reference expression data |
Gene ontology
| Molecular function | transferase activity; acyltransferase activity; metal ion binding; N(6)-L-threonylcarbamoyladenine synthase activity; protein binding; acyltransferase activity, transferring groups other than amino-acyl groups |
| Cellular component | nucleoplasm; plasma membrane; nuclear speck; nucleus; EKC/KEOPS complex; cytoplasm |
| Biological process | tRNA processing; tRNA threonylcarbamoyladenosine modification |
Sources:Amigo / QuickGO
Orthologs
| Databases | NCBI: entry; OMA: entry |
| Species | Human | Mouse |
| Entrez | 55644 | 66246 |
| Ensembl | ENSG00000092094 | ENSMUSG00000006289 |
| UniProt | Q9NPF4 | Q8BWU5 |
| RefSeq (mRNA) | NM_017807 | NM_133676 |
| RefSeq (protein) | NP_060277 | NP_598437 |
| Location (UCSC) | Chr 14: 20.45 – 20.46 Mb | Chr 14: 51.14 – 51.16 Mb |
| PubMed search |
- Wikidata
| View/Edit Human | View/Edit Mouse |

Probable O-sialoglycoprotein endopeptidase is an enzyme in humans encoded by the OSGEP gene.
