= INTS9 =

Protein-coding gene in the species Homo sapiens

Identifiers
- Aliases: INTS9, CPSF2L, INT9, RC74, integrator complex subunit 9
- External IDs: OMIM: 611352; MGI: 1098533; GeneCards: INTS9

Gene location (Human)
Chr.	Chromosome 8 (human)
Band	8p21.1	Start	28,767,661 bp
Band	8p21.1	End	28,890,242 bp

Gene location (Mouse)
Chr.	Chromosome 14 (mouse)
Band	14 D1|14 33.81 cM	Start	65,187,494 bp
Band	14 D1|14 33.81 cM	End	65,277,284 bp
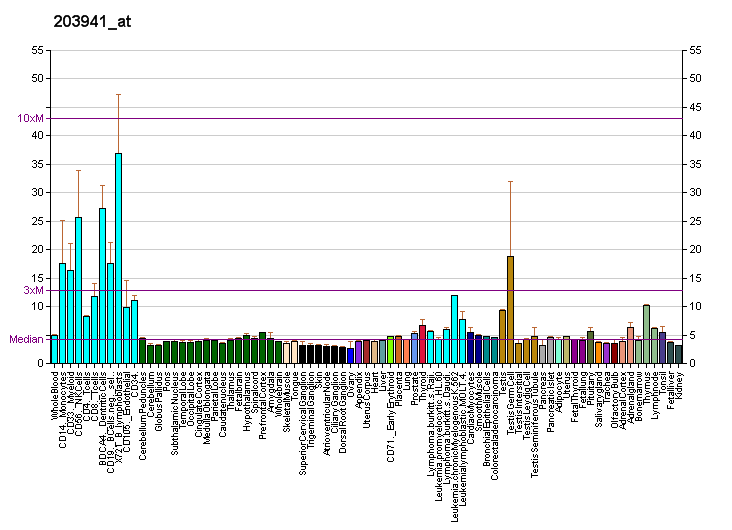
RNA expression pattern
Bgee	Human / Mouse (ortholog); Top expressed in: secondary oocyte; right adrenal gland; right adrenal cortex; left adrenal gland; left adrenal cortex; apex of heart; gonad; testicle; granulocyte; buccal mucosa cell / Top expressed in: primary oocyte; tail of embryo; genital tubercle; maxillary prominence; epiblast; secondary oocyte; mandibular prominence; ankle joint; zygote; internal carotid artery; More reference expression data
BioGPS	More reference expression data
Gene ontology
Molecular function	protein binding
Cellular component	integrator complex; nucleoplasm; cytosol; nucleus
Biological process	snRNA processing; snRNA transcription by RNA polymerase II
Sources:Amigo / QuickGO
Orthologs
Databases	NCBI: entry; OMA: entry
Species	Human	Mouse
Entrez	55756	210925
Ensembl	ENSG00000104299	ENSMUSG00000021975
UniProt	Q9NV88	Q8K114
RefSeq (mRNA)	NM_001145159; NM_001172562; NM_018250; NM_001363038	NM_001253731; NM_153414
RefSeq (protein)	NP_001138631; NP_001166033; NP_060720; NP_001349967	NP_001240660; NP_700463
Location (UCSC)	Chr 8: 28.77 – 28.89 Mb	Chr 14: 65.19 – 65.28 Mb
PubMed search
- Wikidata
View/Edit Human	View/Edit Mouse

Integrator complex subunit 9 is a protein that in Humans is encoded by the INTS9 gene.
