= Nuclear pore complex protein Nup133 =

Protein found in humans

NUP133
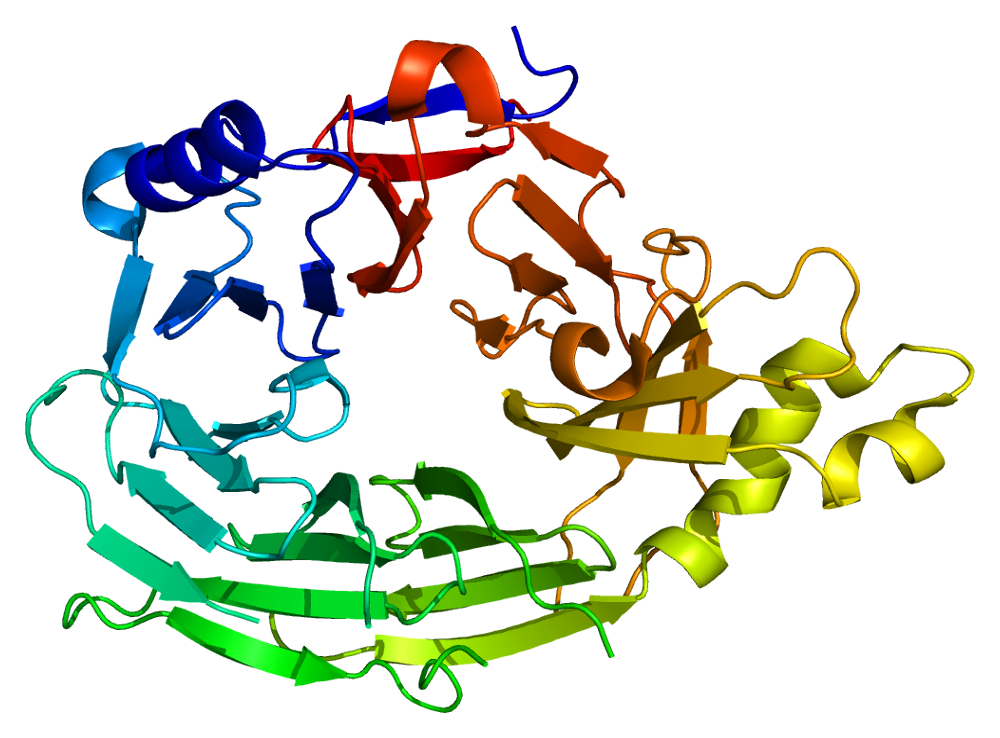

Identifiers
- Aliases: NUP133, hnucleoporin 133kDa, nucleoporin 133, NPHS18, GAMOS8
- External IDs: OMIM: 607613; MGI: 2442620; GeneCards: NUP133
Available structures
PDB	Ortholog search: PDBe RCSB
PDB	List of PDB id codes 1XKS, 3CQC, 3CQG, 3I4R, 5A9Q

Gene location (Human)
Chr.	Chromosome 1 (human)
Band	1q42.13	Start	229,440,259 bp
Band	1q42.13	End	229,508,341 bp

Gene location (Mouse)
Chr.	Chromosome 8 (mouse)
Band	8|8 E2	Start	124,623,862 bp
Band	8|8 E2	End	124,676,004 bp
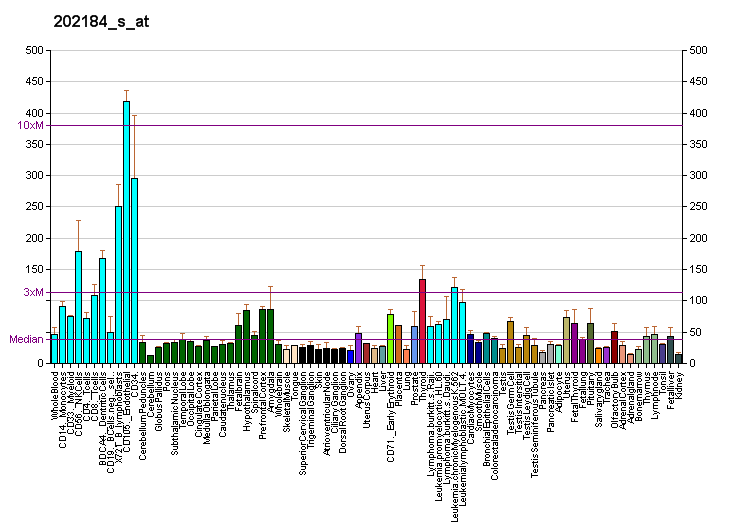
RNA expression pattern
Bgee	Human / Mouse (ortholog); Top expressed in: secondary oocyte; ventricular zone; gonad; parietal pleura; tibia; germinal epithelium; visceral pleura; palpebral conjunctiva; epithelium of nasopharynx; ganglionic eminence / Top expressed in: otic vesicle; spermatocyte; Gonadal ridge; spermatid; otic placode; somite; epiblast; primitive streak; mandibular prominence; seminiferous tubule; More reference expression data
BioGPS	More reference expression data
Gene ontology
Molecular function	protein binding; structural constituent of nuclear pore
Cellular component	nucleus; nuclear envelope; chromosome; chromosome, centromeric region; kinetochore; membrane; cytosol; outer kinetochore; nuclear membrane; nuclear pore; nuclear pore outer ring; host cell
Biological process	protein import into nucleus; protein transport; viral process; neurogenesis; neural tube development; regulation of transcription, DNA-templated; viral transcription; mRNA transport; regulation of cellular response to heat; paraxial mesoderm development; mitotic nuclear membrane disassembly; nuclear pore organization; protein sumoylation; somite development; intracellular transport of virus; mRNA export from nucleus; chromatin organization; tRNA export from nucleus; sister chromatid cohesion; transcription-dependent tethering of RNA polymerase II gene DNA at nuclear periphery; regulation of gene silencing by miRNA; regulation of glycolytic process; transport; nephron development
Sources:Amigo / QuickGO
Orthologs
Databases	NCBI: entry; OMA: entry
Species	Human	Mouse
Entrez	55746	234865
Ensembl	ENSG00000069248	ENSMUSG00000039509
UniProt	Q8WUM0	Q8R0G9
RefSeq (mRNA)	NM_018230	NM_172288
RefSeq (protein)	NP_060700	NP_758492
Location (UCSC)	Chr 1: 229.44 – 229.51 Mb	Chr 8: 124.62 – 124.68 Mb
PubMed search
- Wikidata
View/Edit Human	View/Edit Mouse

Nuclear pore complex protein Nup133, or Nucleoporin Nup133, is a protein that in humans is encoded by the NUP133 gene.

== Function ==
The nuclear envelope creates distinct nuclear and cytoplasmic compartments in eukaryotic cells. It consists of two concentric membranes perforated by nuclear pores, large protein complexes that form aqueous channels to regulate the flow of macromolecules between the nucleus and the cytoplasm. These complexes are composed of at least 100 different polypeptide subunits, many of which belong to the nucleoporin family. The nucleoporin protein encoded by this gene displays evolutionarily conserved interactions with other nucleoporins. This protein, which localizes to both sides of the nuclear pore complex at interphase, remains associated with the complex during mitosis and is targeted at early stages to the reforming nuclear envelope. This protein also localizes to kinetochores of mitotic cells.

== Interactions ==
NUP133 has been shown to interact with NUP107.
