= INTS11 =

Protein-coding gene in humans

Identifiers
- Aliases: INTS11, CPSF73L, INT11, RC-68, RC68, CPSF3L, cleavage and polyadenylation specific factor 3-like, integrator complex subunit 11
- External IDs: OMIM: 611354; MGI: 1919207; GeneCards: INTS11

Gene location (Human)
Chr.	Chromosome 1 (human)
Band	1p36.33	Start	1,311,585 bp
Band	1p36.33	End	1,324,687 bp

Gene location (Mouse)
Chr.	Chromosome 4 (mouse)
Band	4 E2|4 87.66 cM	Start	155,954,003 bp
Band	4 E2|4 87.66 cM	End	155,973,560 bp
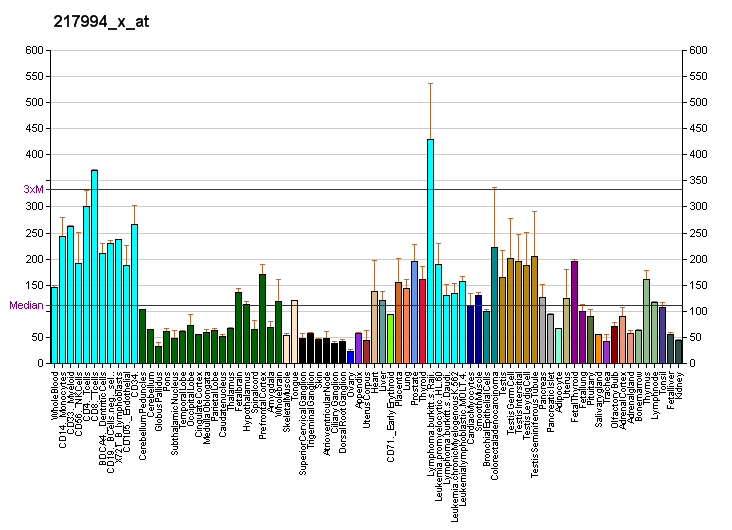
RNA expression pattern
Bgee	Human / Mouse (ortholog); Top expressed in: right hemisphere of cerebellum; right uterine tube; body of uterus; right ovary; left ovary; canal of the cervix; muscle layer of sigmoid colon; pituitary gland; left uterine tube; fundus / Top expressed in: primitive streak; granulocyte; ventricular zone; embryo; morula; epiblast; medial ganglionic eminence; spermatocyte; embryo; lip; More reference expression data
BioGPS	More reference expression data
Gene ontology
Molecular function	hydrolase activity; protein binding
Cellular component	blood microparticle; integrator complex; nucleoplasm; cytosol; nucleus; cytoplasm
Biological process	snRNA processing; snRNA transcription by RNA polymerase II; snRNA 3'-end processing; regulation of RNA splicing
Sources:Amigo / QuickGO
Orthologs
Databases	NCBI: entry; OMA: entry
Species	Human	Mouse
Entrez	54973	71957
Ensembl	ENSG00000127054	ENSMUSG00000029034
UniProt	Q5TA45	Q9CWS4
RefSeq (mRNA)	NM_001256456; NM_001256460; NM_001256462; NM_001256463; NM_017871 NM_032179	NM_028020
RefSeq (protein)	NP_001243385; NP_001243389; NP_001243391; NP_001243392; NP_060341	NP_082296
Location (UCSC)	Chr 1: 1.31 – 1.32 Mb	Chr 4: 155.95 – 155.97 Mb
PubMed search
- Wikidata
View/Edit Human	View/Edit Mouse

Integrator complex subunit 11 is a protein that in humans is encoded by the CPSF3L gene.
