= TP53RK =

Protein-coding gene in humans

Identifiers
- Aliases: TP53RK, BUD32, C20orf64, Nori-2, Nori-2p, PRPK, dJ101A2, TP53 regulating kinase, GAMOS4, TPRKB
- External IDs: OMIM: 608679; MGI: 1914050; GeneCards: TP53RK
Enzyme activity
| EC # | BRENDA | ExPASy | KEGG | MetaCyc |
|---|---|---|---|---|
| 2.7.11.1 | ↗ | ↗ | ↗ | ↗ |

Gene location (Human)
| Chr. | Chromosome 20 (human) |
| Band | 20q13.12 | Start | 46,684,365 bp |
| Band | 20q13.12 | End | 46,689,444 bp |

Gene location (Mouse)
| Chr. | Chromosome 2 (mouse) |
| Band | 2|2 H3 | Start | 166,634,451 bp |
| Band | 2|2 H3 | End | 166,641,425 bp |
RNA expression pattern
| Bgee | Human / Mouse (ortholog); Top expressed in: ventricular zone; ganglionic eminence; islet of Langerhans; bronchial epithelial cell; stromal cell of endometrium; gonad; cartilage tissue; olfactory zone of nasal mucosa; right adrenal cortex; epithelium of nasopharynx / Top expressed in: spermatid; female urethra; embryo; granulocyte; embryo; lumbar spinal ganglion; primitive streak; stroma of kidney; epiblast; yolk sac; More reference expression data |
| BioGPS | n/a |
Gene ontology
| Molecular function | kinase activity; transferase activity; nucleotide binding; protein kinase activity; p53 binding; protein binding; ATP binding; hydrolase activity; phosphotransferase activity, alcohol group as acceptor; protein serine/threonine kinase activity |
| Cellular component | cytosol; membrane; nucleus; nucleoplasm; EKC/KEOPS complex; cytoplasm |
| Biological process | protein phosphorylation; phosphorylation; tRNA threonylcarbamoyladenosine metabolic process; tRNA processing; regulation of signal transduction by p53 class mediator |
Sources:Amigo / QuickGO
Orthologs
| Databases | NCBI: entry; OMA: entry |
| Species | Human | Mouse |
| Entrez | 112858 | 76367 |
| Ensembl | ENSG00000172315 | ENSMUSG00000042854 |
| UniProt | Q96S44 | Q99PW4 |
| RefSeq (mRNA) | NM_033550 | NM_023815 |
| RefSeq (protein) | NP_291028 | NP_076304.2 |
| Location (UCSC) | Chr 20: 46.68 – 46.69 Mb | Chr 2: 166.63 – 166.64 Mb |
| PubMed search |
- Wikidata
| View/Edit Human | View/Edit Mouse |

TP53-regulating kinase, also known as PRPK, is an enzyme that in humans is encoded by the TP53RK gene. This protein is a serine/threonine protein kinase that phosphorylates p53 at Ser15.

PRPK is part of the KEOPS/EKC complex, which participates in transcription control, telomere regulation and tRNA modification.
