= Nucleoporin 107 =

Protein-coding gene in the species Homo sapiens

NUP107
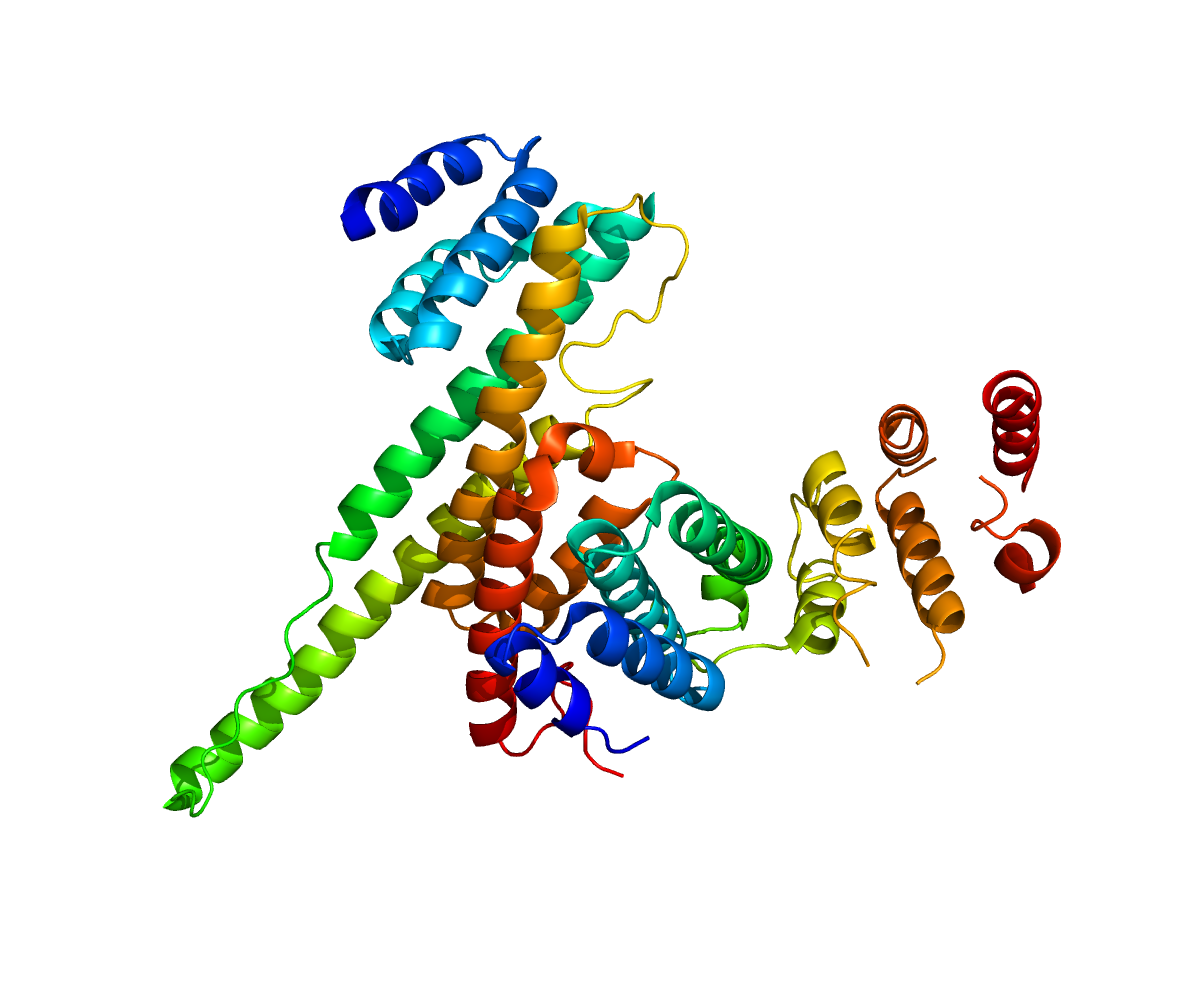

Identifiers
- Aliases: NUP107, NUP84, NPHS11, nucleoporin 107kDa, nucleoporin 107, ODG6, ODG6; GAMOS7
- External IDs: OMIM: 607617; MGI: 2143854; GeneCards: NUP107
Available structures
PDB	Ortholog search: PDBe RCSB
PDB	List of PDB id codes 3CQC, 3CQG, 3I4R, 5A9Q

Gene location (Human)
Chr.	Chromosome 12 (human)
Band	12q15	Start	68,686,951 bp
Band	12q15	End	68,745,809 bp

Gene location (Mouse)
Chr.	Chromosome 10 (mouse)
Band	10|10 D2	Start	117,586,526 bp
Band	10|10 D2	End	117,628,610 bp
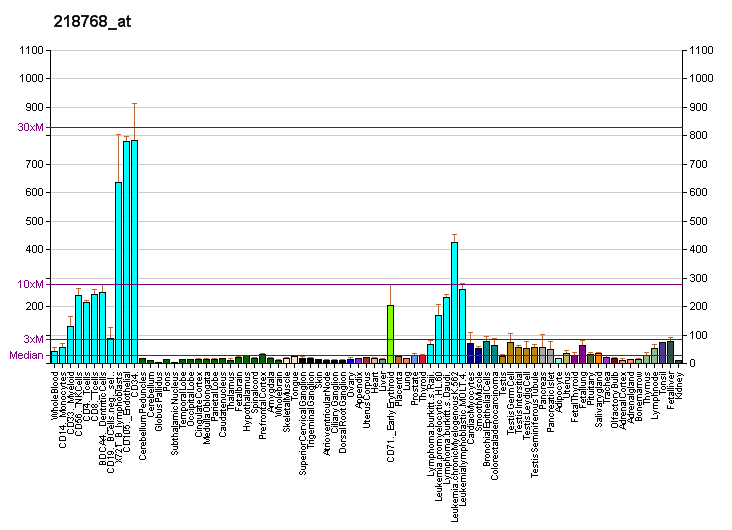
RNA expression pattern
Bgee	Human / Mouse (ortholog); Top expressed in: secondary oocyte; ventricular zone; Achilles tendon; embryo; ganglionic eminence; rectum; parietal pleura; germinal epithelium; gastric mucosa; visceral pleura / Top expressed in: primitive streak; tail of embryo; oocyte; primary oocyte; secondary oocyte; zygote; yolk sac; genital tubercle; epiblast; abdominal wall; More reference expression data
BioGPS	More reference expression data
Gene ontology
Molecular function	structural constituent of nuclear pore; protein binding
Cellular component	cytosol; centrosome; nuclear membrane; nuclear periphery; membrane; nuclear envelope; nuclear pore; nucleoplasm; chromosome; nuclear pore outer ring; chromosome, centromeric region; nucleus; kinetochore; host cell
Biological process	mRNA transport; nuclear pore complex assembly; regulation of transcription, DNA-templated; protein import into nucleus; viral transcription; protein sumoylation; mitotic nuclear membrane disassembly; regulation of cellular response to heat; protein transport; posttranscriptional tethering of RNA polymerase II gene DNA at nuclear periphery; viral process; tRNA export from nucleus; sister chromatid cohesion; intracellular transport of virus; mRNA export from nucleus; female gonad development; regulation of gene silencing by miRNA; regulation of glycolytic process; transport; nephron development
Sources:Amigo / QuickGO
Orthologs
Databases	NCBI: entry; OMA: entry
Species	Human	Mouse
Entrez	57122	103468
Ensembl	ENSG00000111581	ENSMUSG00000052798
UniProt	P57740	Q8BH74
RefSeq (mRNA)	NM_020401; NM_001330192	NM_134010
RefSeq (protein)	NP_001317121; NP_065134	NP_598771
Location (UCSC)	Chr 12: 68.69 – 68.75 Mb	Chr 10: 117.59 – 117.63 Mb
PubMed search
- Wikidata
View/Edit Human	View/Edit Mouse

Nucleoporin 107 (Nup107) is a protein that in humans is encoded by the NUP107 gene.

== Function ==
This gene encodes a member of the nucleoporin family. The protein is localized to the nuclear rim and is an essential component of the nuclear pore complex (NPC). All molecules entering or leaving the nucleus either diffuse through or are actively transported by the NPC. Alternate transcriptional splice variants of this gene have been observed but have not been thoroughly characterized.

== Interactions ==
NUP107 has been shown to interact with NUP133.
