= Microcoria =

- Specialty: Ophthalmology

Microcoria is a congenital disease in which the pupils of the subject are narrower than 2 mm in diameter. Microcoria is associated with juvenile-onset glaucoma. It is also associated with Pierson syndrome characterized by microcoria and congenital nephrotic syndrome. The defect is in the Laminin beta 2 gene on chromosome 3p21 which encodes a protein essential to the glomerular basement membrane.

It is also part of the known manifestations of a born infant to a mother suffering from uncontrolled hyperglycemia. Other symptoms include transposition of great vessels, respiratory distress secondary to surfactant defect, sacral agensis, jitteriness, irritability, and lethargy due to rebound fetal hypoglycemia. Congenital microcoria is an autosomal dominant trait. However, it can also occur sporadically.

== See also ==
- Miosis
