= Nephrin =

Mammalian protein found in Homo sapiens

NPHS1

Identifiers
- Aliases: NPHS1, CNF, NPHN, nephrin, NPHS1 nephrin, nephrin, NPHS1 adhesion molecule, nephrin
- External IDs: OMIM: 602716; MGI: 1859637; GeneCards: NPHS1
Available structures
PDB	Ortholog search: PDBe RCSB
PDB	List of PDB id codes 4ZRT

Gene location (Human)
Chr.	Chromosome 19 (human)
Band	19q13.12	Start	35,825,372 bp
Band	19q13.12	End	35,869,287 bp

Gene location (Mouse)
Chr.	Chromosome 7 (mouse)
Band	7|7 B1	Start	30,157,740 bp
Band	7|7 B1	End	30,186,648 bp
RNA expression pattern
Bgee	Human / Mouse (ortholog); Top expressed in: buccal mucosa cell; body of pancreas; vena cava; tendon of biceps brachii; Skeletal muscle tissue of rectus abdominis; glomerulus; metanephric glomerulus; human kidney; mucosa of pharynx; nipple / Top expressed in: glomerulus; embryo; embryo; morula; neural layer of retina; gastrula; blastocyst; dentate gyrus of hippocampal formation granule cell; right kidney; pancreas; More reference expression data
BioGPS	n/a
Gene ontology
Molecular function	myosin binding; protein binding
Cellular component	integral component of membrane; cell projection; membrane; plasma membrane; integral component of plasma membrane; intracellular anatomical structure; slit diaphragm; extracellular exosome; focal adhesion
Biological process	excretion; glomerular visceral epithelial cell development; positive regulation of actin filament polymerization; glomerular basement membrane development; muscle organ development; regulation of excretion; MAPK cascade; multicellular organism development; JNK cascade; cell adhesion; myoblast fusion; skeletal muscle tissue development; protein localization to synapse; axon guidance; T cell costimulation
Sources:Amigo / QuickGO
Orthologs
Databases	NCBI: entry; OMA: entry
Species	Human	Mouse
Entrez	4868	54631
Ensembl	ENSG00000161270	ENSMUSG00000006649
UniProt	O60500	Q9QZS7
RefSeq (mRNA)	NM_004646	NM_019459
RefSeq (protein)	NP_004637	NP_062332
Location (UCSC)	Chr 19: 35.83 – 35.87 Mb	Chr 7: 30.16 – 30.19 Mb
PubMed search
- Wikidata
View/Edit Human	View/Edit Mouse

Nephrin is a protein necessary for the proper functioning of the renal filtration barrier. The renal filtration barrier consists of fenestrated endothelial cells, the glomerular basement membrane, and the podocytes of epithelial cells. Nephrin is a transmembrane protein that is a structural component of the slit diaphragm. It is present on the tips of the podocytes as an intricate mesh connecting adjacent foot processes. Nephrin contributes to the strong size selectivity of the slit diaphragm, however, the relative contribution of the slit diaphragm to exclusion of protein by the glomerulus is debated. The extracellular interactions, both homophilic and heterophilic—between nephrin and NEPH1—are not completely understood. In addition to eight immunoglobulin G–like motifs and a fibronectin type 3 repeat, nephrin has a single transmembrane domain and a short intracellular tail. Tyrosine phosphorylation at different sites on the intracellular tail contribute to the regulation of slit diaphragm formation during development and repair in pathology affecting podocytes. Podocin may interact with nephrin to guide it onto lipid rafts in podocytes, requiring the integrity of an arginine residue of nephrin at position 1160.

A defect in the gene for nephrin, NPHS1, is associated with congenital nephrotic syndrome of the Finnish type and causes massive amounts of protein to be leaked into the urine, or proteinuria. Nephrin is also required for cardiovascular development.

== Interactions ==
Nephrin has been shown to interact with:

- CASK,
- CD2AP,
- CDH3 and
- CTNND1,
- FYN,
- KIRREL, and
- NPHS2.

== Discovery ==
Nephrin was first identified in 1998 by Karl Tryggvason and colleagues, who discovered mutations in the NPHS1 gene in a Finnish newborn with congenital nephrotic syndrome of the Finnish type. Based on its structural features, the authors concluded that nephrin was likely to function as both an adhesion receptor and a signalling protein.

== See also ==
- Podocyte
