= Podocin =

Protein found in humans

NPHS2

Identifiers
- Aliases: NPHS2, PDCN, SRN1, NPHS2 podocin, podocin, NPHS2 stomatin family member, podocin
- External IDs: OMIM: 604766; MGI: 2157018; GeneCards: NPHS2

Gene location (Human)
| Chr. | Chromosome 1 (human) |
| Band | 1q25.2 | Start | 179,550,539 bp |
| Band | 1q25.2 | End | 179,575,952 bp |

Gene location (Mouse)
| Chr. | Chromosome 1 (mouse) |
| Band | 1|1 G3 | Start | 156,138,297 bp |
| Band | 1|1 G3 | End | 156,155,605 bp |
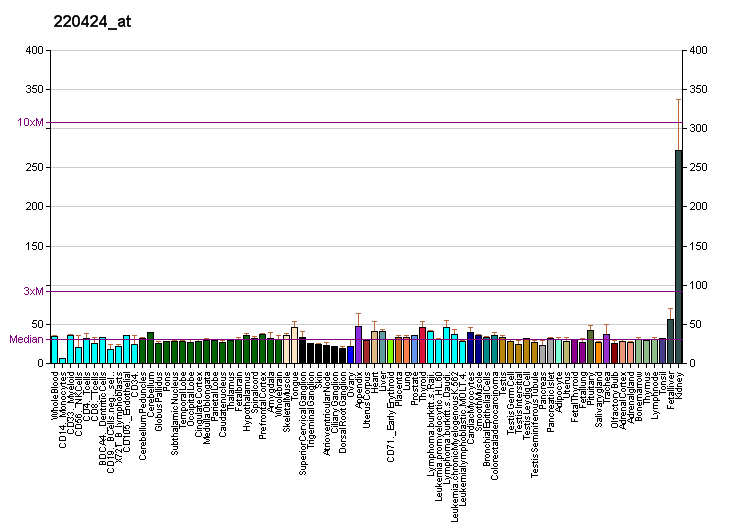
RNA expression pattern
| Bgee | Human / Mouse (ortholog); Top expressed in: glomerulus; metanephric glomerulus; human kidney; testicle; kidney tubule; sperm; gonad; renal medulla; right testis; left testis / Top expressed in: glomerulus; Bowman's capsule; right kidney; parietal layer of glomerular capsule; human kidney; morula; thymus; embryo; embryo; medullary collecting duct; More reference expression data |
| BioGPS | More reference expression data |
Gene ontology
| Molecular function | protein binding |
| Cellular component | extracellular exosome; slit diaphragm; membrane raft; plasma membrane; membrane; intrinsic component of the cytoplasmic side of the plasma membrane; cell-cell junction; endoplasmic reticulum; integral component of plasma membrane; protein-containing complex |
| Biological process | actin cytoskeleton reorganization; metanephric glomerular visceral epithelial cell development; excretion |
Sources:Amigo / QuickGO
Orthologs
| Databases | NCBI: entry; OMA: entry |
| Species | Human | Mouse |
| Entrez | 7827 | 170484 |
| Ensembl | ENSG00000116218 | ENSMUSG00000026602 |
| UniProt | Q9NP85 | Q91X05 |
| RefSeq (mRNA) | NM_001297575; NM_014625 | NM_130456 |
| RefSeq (protein) | NP_001284504; NP_055440 | NP_569723 |
| Location (UCSC) | Chr 1: 179.55 – 179.58 Mb | Chr 1: 156.14 – 156.16 Mb |
| PubMed search |
- Wikidata
| View/Edit Human | View/Edit Mouse |

Podocin is a protein that in humans is encoded by the gene NPHS2 (from "nephrosis 2"). It is a component of the filtration slits of podocytes. Glomerular capillary endothelial cells, the glomerular basement membrane and the filtration slits function as the filtration barrier of the kidney glomerulus. Mutations in the podocin gene NPHS2 can cause nephrotic syndrome, such as focal segmental glomerulosclerosis (FSGS) or minimal change disease (MCD). Symptoms may develop in the first few months of life (congenital nephrotic syndrome) or later in childhood.

== Structure ==
Podocin is a membrane protein of the band-7-stomatin family, consisting of 383 amino acids. It has a transmembrane domain forming a hairpin structure, with two cytoplasmic ends at the N- and C-terminus, the latter of which interacts with the cytosolic tail of nephrin, with CD2AP serving as an adaptor.

== Function ==
Podocin is localized on the membranes of podocyte foot processes (pedicels) where it oligomerizes in lipid rafts together with nephrin to form the filtration slits.

== Interactions ==
NPHS2 has been shown to interact with Nephrin and CD2AP.
